= Taishō Democracy =

Period of Japanese history (1905–1932)

Taishō Democracy (Japanese: 大正デモクラシー, Taishō demokurashī) was a period of political and social change in the Empire of Japan that began in the final years of the Meiji period and lasted through the Taishō period, typically referring to the years from roughly 1905 to 1932. The period was characterized by a broad movement for greater political participation, the rise of party politics, and the emergence of a vibrant civil society, including significant labor and social movements. This era of "imperial democracy" saw the power of the elected Diet expand and witnessed the establishment of party governments, a major shift from the earlier oligarchic rule of the genrō.

The movement's roots lay in the political framework of the Meiji Constitution, which created an elected lower house, and was fueled by the rise of a literate, urban populace and a growing working class. The era began with a wave of mass urban protests, most notably the 1905 Hibiya riots, which demonstrated a new popular desire to influence government policy. This "political crowd" expressed a nascent ideology that combined support for the emperor and empire with demands that the government respect the popular will. Concurrently, Japan's political parties, led by figures like Hara Takashi and Katō Takaaki, transitioned from protest movements to "established parties" competing for control of the government, culminating in the establishment of the first true party cabinet under Hara in 1918.

The high point of the era in the 1920s saw the passage of the 1925 General Election Law, which granted universal male suffrage, expanding the electorate fourfold. This period also saw a "labor offensive", with the proliferation of labor unions and disputes, and the emergence of "proletarian parties" that contested elections. However, the expansion of political rights was accompanied by the repressive Peace Preservation Law, also passed in 1925, which targeted leftist radical ideologies.

The era of Taishō Democracy came to an end in the early 1930s. The social and economic crisis of the Great Depression, coupled with the Mukden incident of 1931 and the rise of Japanese militarism, created an environment whereby parliamentary rule was seen as ineffective. After a series of political assassinations, most notably the May 15 Incident in 1932 which killed Prime Minister Inukai Tsuyoshi, party cabinets were replaced by "national unity" cabinets dominated by bureaucrats and military leaders, marking the end of the Taishō Democracy period and the transition to an era of "imperial fascism".

== Etymology and historiography ==
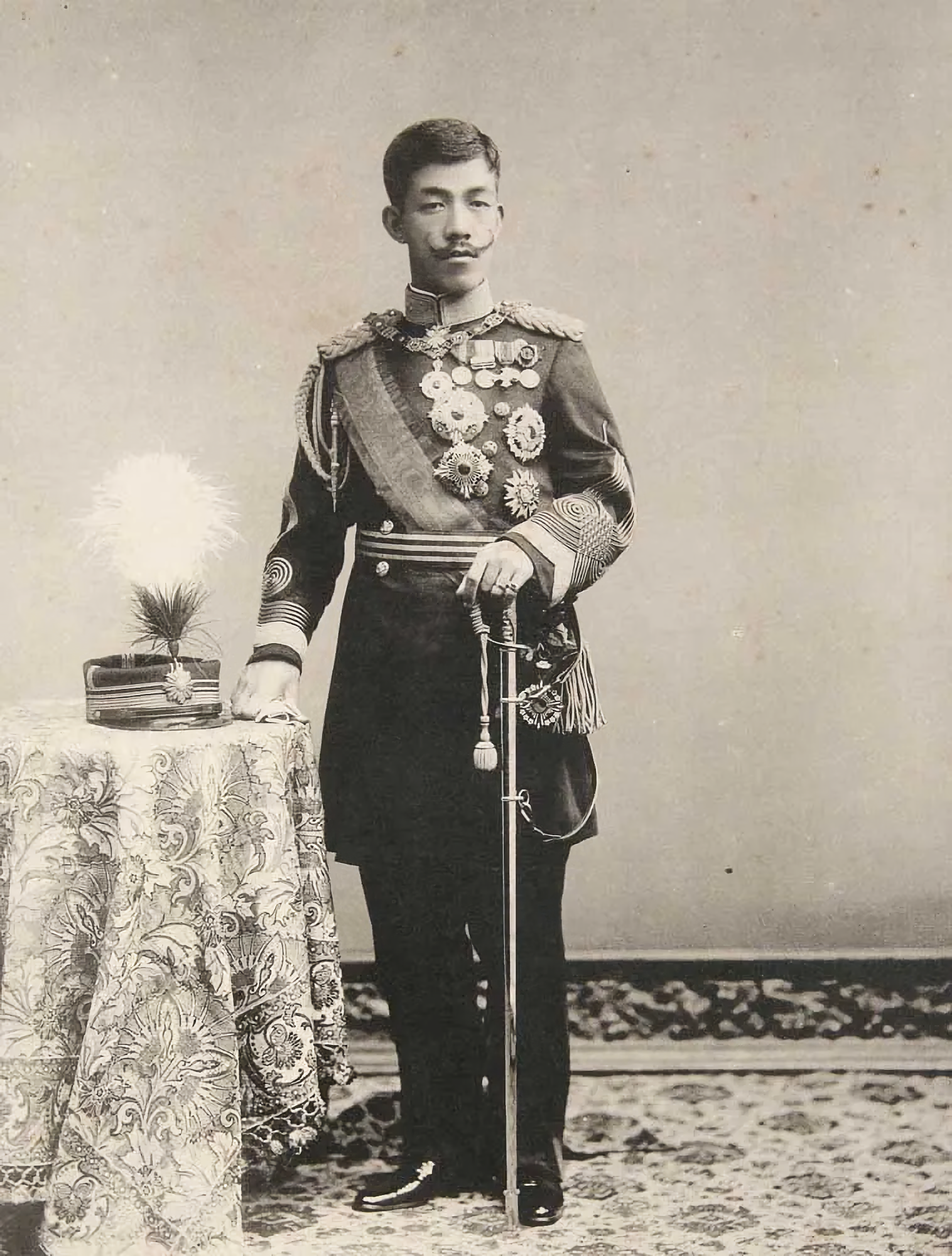
Emperor Taishō in 1912

The term Taishō Democracy refers to the Taishō period (1912–1926) of Emperor Taishō's reign. However, historians generally agree that the political and social movements that define the era began in the final years of the preceding Meiji era, with the Hibiya riots of 1905 often cited as a starting point. The period is seen as ending around 1932 with the collapse of party government.

Scholarly interpretation of the period has been a subject of debate. Early foreign observers and later critics often dismissed Taishō Democracy as a superficial flirtation with Western political models that failed to take deep root within Japanese society. This view points to the movement's inability to prevent the rise of Japanese militarism and fascism in the 1930s. In contrast, many Japanese historians, and a number of Western scholars, see the period as a time of profound and significant change. They argue that the era marked a fundamental shift in Japanese politics and society, with the emergence of a genuine popular desire for greater political participation and the establishment of "normal constitutional government" based on party cabinets. Historian Marius Jansen described the era as one of "irony and paradox," noting that Japan achieved imperial status just as traditional territorial imperialism was ending, and its military might approached world standards just as World War I produced revulsion from armament.

Historian Andrew Gordon has proposed the alternative term "imperial democracy" (teikoku demokurashī) to describe the period. He argues that "Taishō democracy" is a chronologically inaccurate and analytically weak concept. The term "imperial democracy" is intended to capture what Gordon sees as the central, inherent contradiction of the era: a movement that simultaneously pushed for wider democratic participation while also fervently supporting the emperor and the expansion of the Japanese Empire. According to this view, the popular democratic movements and the political elite were united in their commitment to both national glory and greater political involvement, seeing the two as inseparable. This framework seeks to explain both the depth of the democratic movement and its eventual collapse, as the contradiction between "democracy" and "empire" became untenable in the crises of the 1930s.

== Background ==
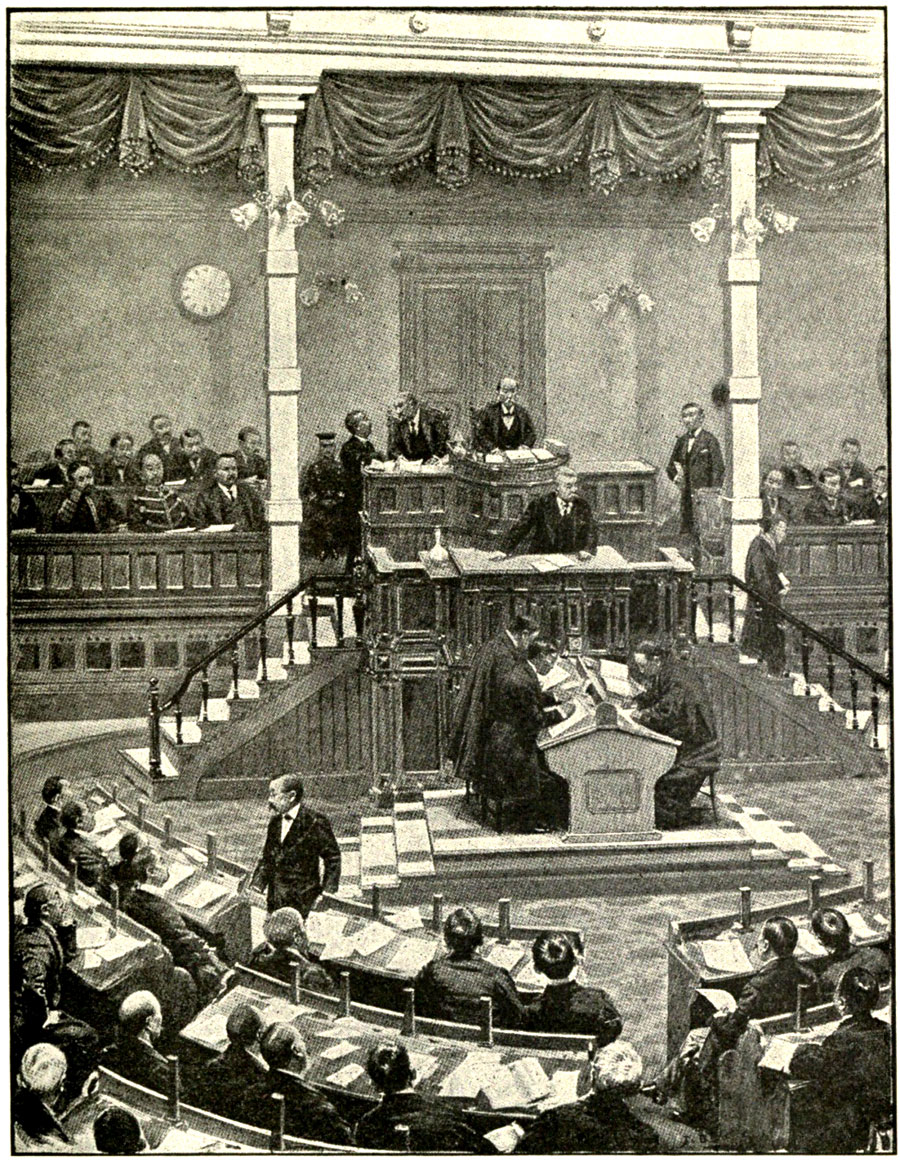
Depiction of the Diet in session, 1915

The political and social changes of the Taishō period were rooted in the developments of the Meiji Restoration. A deep cultural animosity toward political division, inherited from the Tokugawa period's suppression of "factions" (toha) as treasonous, created a hostile environment for partisan politics. Despite this, the Meiji Constitution of 1889, while granting supreme sovereignty to the Emperor, also established an elected House of Representatives as part of the Imperial Diet. Though its powers were limited, the Diet provided a national political stage and an institutional nucleus around which political parties could coalesce. The early parties, born from a split within the ruling oligarchy over the 1873 Seikanron debate and the subsequent Freedom and People's Rights Movement of the 1870s and 1880s, began as protest movements against the ruling hambatsu (clan-based) oligarchy, but gradually transitioned into "established parties" seeking to gain power within the constitutional system.

A crucial factor enabling the new political movements was the creation of a literate populace. The Meiji government's promotion of universal education meant that by 1905, over 95% of school-age children were attending school. This "revolution in basic literacy" created a mass audience for new ideas, disseminated through a burgeoning, partisan press. Inexpensive, anti-government newspapers like the Yorozu Chōhō were particularly popular among the urban poor and lower-middle classes, filling their pages with both jingoism and calls for a greater popular role in politics.

Industrialization and imperialism also fundamentally shaped the era. The growth of industrial capitalism, particularly in heavy industry, created a large urban working class concentrated in cities like Tokyo and Osaka. These new urbanites, facing uncertain livelihoods and often living in dense, working-class neighborhoods like Tokyo's Nankatsu district, formed the backbone of the new social and political movements. Japan's emergence as an imperial power, marked by victories in the First Sino-Japanese War (1894–1895) and the Russo-Japanese War (1904–1905), fostered a strong sense of nationalism. However, the immense financial cost of empire, funded by heavy taxes and foreign bonds, created widespread economic grievances. This fostered the belief that the people, whose sacrifice made the empire possible, deserved a greater say in the political process. The mass victory celebrations during the Russo-Japanese War created a precedent for popular public assembly, setting the stage for the political protests that would soon follow.

== Movement for imperial democracy (1905–1918) ==
The first phase of the Taishō Democracy was a period of popular protest and movement-building that challenged the established oligarchic order. It was characterized by mass urban protest, the birth of a modern labor movement, and a parallel struggle by political parties to gain control of the government.

=== Political crowd and urban protest ===
Demonstrators in Hibiya Park in Tokyo during the Hibiya incendiary incident, 1905

The era began with a series of large-scale urban riots in Tokyo between 1905 and 1918, which marked the emergence of the "political crowd" as a new force in Japanese politics. The most significant of these was the Hibiya incendiary incident of September 1905. The riot erupted when police banned a rally at Hibiya Park called to protest the terms of the Treaty of Portsmouth, which ended the Russo-Japanese War. Tens of thousands of angry citizens overwhelmed the police, and for three days rioting swept the city. This "popular fury, directed at a government people did not trust," saw crowds destroy over 70% of the police boxes in Tokyo, attack the residence of the Home Minister, and target pro-government newspapers.

This and subsequent riots followed a pattern of "political theater". They were typically organized by political groups, preceded by speeches, and used symbolic dates and locations. The Hibiya riot and its successors were often timed to coincide with the anniversary of the 1905 protest or with Founding Day (February 11), a national holiday the protesters co-opted to express their own political vision. The participants, drawn from a broad cross-section of urban society including artisans, shopkeepers, and factory workers, articulated an ideology of "imperial democracy". While expressing fervent loyalty to the emperor and the empire, they violently protested a government they saw as acting against the popular will. Their slogans and actions asserted that public spaces like Hibiya Park belonged to the people and demanded that the government, as a servant of both emperor and people, respect the popular will (kokumin no ishi).

=== Rise of the labor movement ===
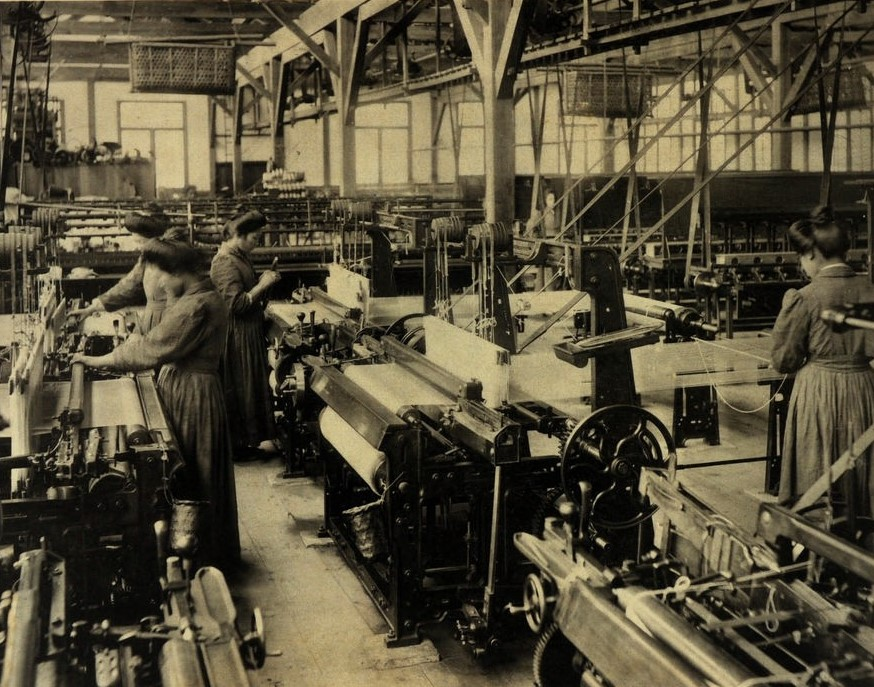
Textile factory in Fukui Prefecture, 1910

Concurrent with the urban protests, a new tradition of labor disputes emerged in Japan's modern industries. Between 1897 and 1917, hundreds of disputes took place, particularly in the large, heavily capitalized shipyards, arsenals, and machine shops. These actions, usually conducted without the leadership of formal unions, marked a shift from the guild-based protests of traditional artisans. Instead of resisting new technology, workers in modern industries protested for higher wages, better treatment, and greater social respect. Demands often focused on ending "inhuman" or discriminatory treatment and gaining a status on par with white-collar employees, reflecting a new working-class consciousness.

This period also saw the birth of Japan's first stable, modern labor organization. The Yūaikai (Friendly Society) was founded by Suzuki Bunji in 1912. Initially a moderate organization focused on mutual aid, education, and "harmonization" of labor and capital, the Yūaikai grew rapidly. It established locals in the industrial neighborhoods of Tokyo and other cities, attracting thousands of members, including foremen and skilled workers in heavy industry as well as female textile workers. The union's appeal lay in its promise of recognition, respect, and community. It published magazines, held large rallies and "tea meetings", and offered workers a sense of dignity and a platform to voice their grievances. Through the Yūaikai, workers began to articulate a program demanding not just better treatment but also a respected place in the broader society, as "humans and people of the nation (kokumin)". By 1917, the union was involved in seventy labor-management disputes, and in 1921 it was reorganized into the more confrontational General Federation of Labor (Sōdōmei).

=== Party politics and the Taishō Political Crisis ===
While popular movements challenged the government from the streets, political parties worked to gain power from within the Diet. This process began in earnest after the failure of the 1877 Satsuma Rebellion demonstrated that armed revolt was no longer a viable method of opposition, leaving political parties as the main channel for dissent. The early party leaders, such as Itagaki Taisuke, adopted the language of Western liberalism, calling for a representative assembly to "arouse in [the people] a spirit of enterprise" and make the country strong. However, they saw popular rights primarily as an instrument for building national power rather than an end in themselves. After a political crisis in 1881, the government promised a constitution by 1890, leading to the formation of Japan's first modern parties, the Liberal Party (Jiyūtō) and the Rikken Kaishintō. Party leaders like Hara Takashi of the right-wing Rikken Seiyūkai realized that direct confrontation with the oligarchy was futile and instead pursued a strategy of compromise and tactical alliance with the genrō to expand their influence. The Seiyūkai, by building a strong electoral base (jiban) through patronage and pork-barrel legislation, established itself as the dominant party in the Diet.

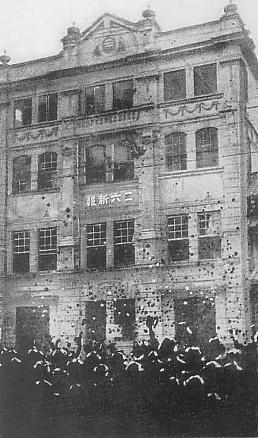
Mob vandalizing the pro-government Niroku Shimposha newspaper office during the Taishō political crisis, 1913

The growing power of the Seiyūkai led to the Taishō Political Crisis of 1912–1913. The crisis was triggered when the army brought down the Seiyūkai-supported Saionji Kinmochi cabinet by refusing to supply a minister. This structural weakness stemmed from the Meiji Constitution whereby the Japanese military did not answer to the civilian Diet (parliament) or even directly to the prime minister; they answered only to the Emperor. This allowed the military to defy policies they disliked, such as diplomatic efforts to reduce military spending and appointing ministers to the cabinet, which affected its formation and survival.

The genrō then appointed one of their own proteges, Katsura Tarō, as premier. This move provoked a widespread popular backlash, the "Movement for Constitutional Government" (Kensei Yōgo Undō). Led by journalists and opposition politicians, including the fiery Ozaki Yukio, the movement denounced hambatsu rule and demanded that the cabinet be responsible to the Diet. Faced with this pressure, Katsura attempted to build his own party, the Rikken Dōshikai, by uniting the various anti-Seiyūkai factions. This move marked the beginning of a two-party system in Japan, as it created a viable rival to the Seiyūkai. Although Katsura's government quickly fell, the crisis demonstrated the growing power of the parties and public opinion. The era of covert party government began, culminating in 1918 when the genrō, faced with the massive 1918 rice riots, were forced to appoint Hara Takashi as the first commoner and first true party prime minister.

== Imperial democracy as a ruling system (1918–1932) ==
With the appointment of Hara Takashi's cabinet, the movement for imperial democracy transformed into a ruling system. The 1920s became the high point of pre-war party government and political freedom, an era of what historian Peter Duus calls "normal constitutional government". The period saw the passage of landmark democratic reforms, a further expansion of labor and social movements, and intense political competition between the two main parties.

However, with democracy also came the flourishing of widespread corruption, such as the Siemens scandal, which severely weakened democratic institutions and public faith in party politicians. The growing disillusionment with corrupt party governance provided an opening for militarists who promised to restore "purity and order" in government.

Nationwide rice riots in 1918, triggered by high inflation and a severe spike in rice prices demonstrated a major failure of the government to handle economic distress. The subsequent need to call out the army to suppress the riots led to the downfall of the Terauchi cabinet.

On November 4, 1921, Hara Takashi, Japan's first "commoner" Prime Minister, was stabbed to death by Nakaoka Kon'ichi, a 19-year-old right-wing railway switchman, at Tokyo Station. The assassin, motivated by accusations of corruption and perceived weak leadership, attacked Hara as he prepared to board a train for a party conference in Kyoto. He was influenced by right-wing ideologies opposed to Hara’s policies, including his handling of the Siberian intervention and his attempt at reducing military power, which drew ire from nationalists.

The Washington Naval Treaty of 1922 was also framed by conservatives and militarists as an "Anglo-Saxon iron ring" limiting Japan’s legitimate expansion, further weakening public faith in parliamentary diplomacy.

=== Universal suffrage and Peace Preservation Law ===
The most significant legislative achievement of the era was the expansion of the franchise. The universal suffrage movement, which had gained momentum after World War I, brought together a broad coalition of liberal intellectuals, students, and labor organizations. They argued that the existing system, based on tax qualifications, was unjust and that all men who contributed to the nation as workers and soldiers deserved the right to vote. The Kenseikai, in opposition, eventually adopted universal suffrage as its platform, seeing it both as a "safety valve" to channel popular discontent into parliamentary politics and as a tactical issue to use against the ruling Seiyūkai.

After years of debate and popular demonstrations, the coalition government led by Katō Takaaki of the Kenseikai passed the General Election Law in 1925. The law abolished all tax qualifications and granted the right to vote to all male subjects aged 25 or over, increasing the electorate from roughly 3 million to 12.5 million. However, the expansion of democratic rights was accompanied by a move to contain radicalism. In the same Diet session, the government passed the Peace Preservation Law. This law made it a crime to form an association with the aim of altering the kokutai (the fundamental character of the state, centered on the emperor) or the system of private property. It became the primary legal tool used to suppress communist, anarchist, and other radical movements throughout the pre-war period.

=== Labor offensive and social movements ===
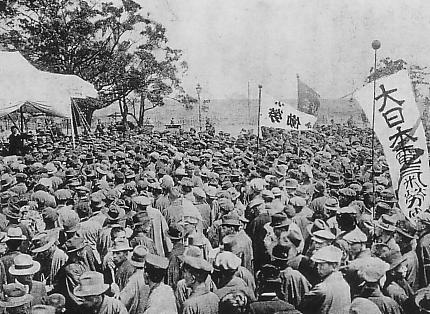
First International Workers' Day rally in Japan, 1920

The post-World War I era saw a "labor offensive" in which union organizing and labor disputes proliferated. The Yūaikai was reorganized into a more militant industrial federation, the Sōdōmei (Japan Federation of Labor). New unions, including radical ones inspired by the Russian Revolution, emerged and competed for members, especially in the industrial neighborhoods of Tokyo. The "dispute culture" that had been developing became a familiar part of working-class life, spreading from the large heavy-industrial plants to smaller factories in the machine, chemical, and textile sectors. Workers engaged in longer and more organized strikes, demanding not just better wages but also formal severance pay systems, the end of discriminatory treatment, and recognition of their unions. Female textile workers, despite facing harsh conditions and restrictions in company dormitories, also began to organize, demanding basic dignities such as better food and the freedom to leave the dorms.

A broader range of social movements also flourished. The student movement, centered around groups like the Shinjinkai (New Man Society) at Tokyo Imperial University, became a hub of liberal and radical thought, advocating for social reform and opposing Japanese foreign policy. The women's movement also gained momentum, with figures like Hiratsuka Raichō and Ichikawa Fusae leading the push for greater rights. Following changes to the Peace Police Law in 1922 that allowed women to attend political meetings, these activists founded the Women's Suffrage League and campaigned for the franchise.

The advent of universal male suffrage spurred the labor movement to enter electoral politics. In 1926, the major union federations and leftist intellectuals formed a series of "proletarian parties". Though plagued by ideological splits between right-wing social democrats, centrists, and a left wing aligned with the illegal Communist Party, these parties began to build a grassroots base in working-class districts. In the first general election under universal suffrage in 1928, the proletarian parties won eight seats and nearly 5% of the national vote, demonstrating a significant new political presence.

== Collapse (1929–1932) ==
The era of Taishō Democracy was ultimately short-lived, collapsing in the face of domestic and international crises in the early 1930s. The institutions and norms of party government proved too fragile to withstand the combined pressures of economic depression, social unrest, and rising militarism.

=== Economic crisis and social polarization ===
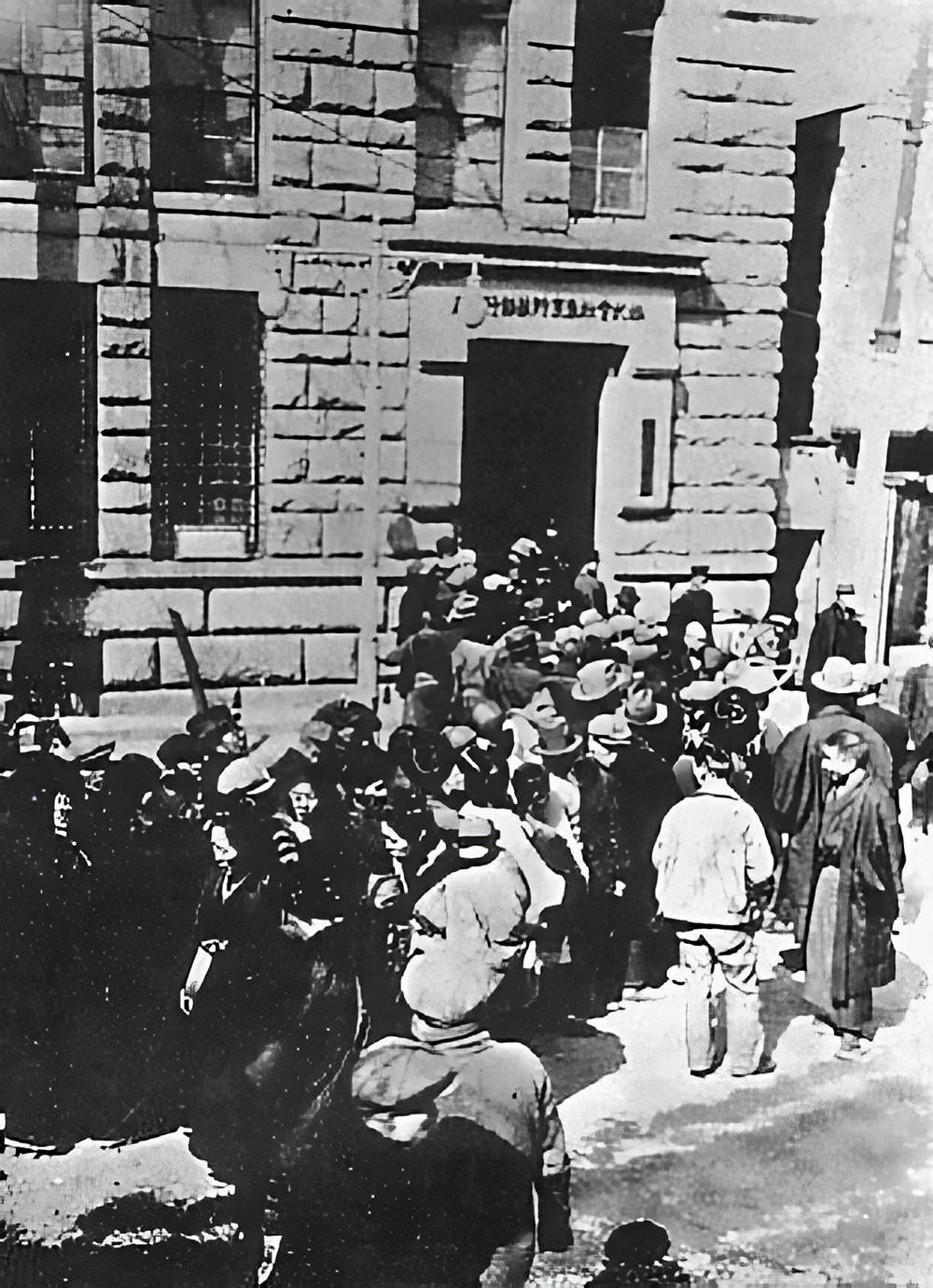
Bank run during the Shōwa financial crisis, 1927

The economic boom of World War I was followed by a period of instability. A postwar depression, the devastating 1923 Great Kantō earthquake, and a major banking crisis in 1927 strained the economy. Then, the Great Depression had a severe impact on Japan, causing a surge in unemployment, bankruptcies, and rural hardship, particularly after the Hamaguchi Osachi cabinet's ill-timed return to the gold standard in 1930. This economic crisis dramatically intensified social conflict. In industrial areas like Nankatsu, labor disputes reached an unprecedented peak in 1930 and 1931. These "depression disputes" were prolonged and bitter, as desperate workers resisted mass dismissals and wage cuts. The period saw theatrical protests, such as the "chimney man" incident at the Fuji Cotton Spinning Company, and large-scale, violent confrontations like the 1930 strike at the Tōyō Muslin factory.

The intense social conflict polarized Japanese society and fueled a sense of national crisis among elites. Business leaders, who had previously tolerated or engaged with moderate unions, grew fearful and hostile. They began to see all labor activism as a revolutionary threat to social order and national strength, and they lost confidence in the ability of the party governments to control the situation. At the same time, a new "Japanist" or "national socialist" labor movement emerged, attacking mainstream unions as selfish and unpatriotic and advocating for a "fusion" of labor and capital in service to the nation. These right-wing unions, often with management support, engaged in violent clashes with existing unions, further destabilizing the labor movement.

=== Rise of militarism and the end of party rule ===
The domestic crisis was inextricably linked with the international situation. The perception of social chaos at home fueled the arguments of military leaders and right-wing radicals who rejected the liberal, internationalist foreign policy of the party governments. Figures like General Kazushige Ugaki argued that Japan's internal weakness and social divisions were a systemic crisis that required a "renovated" foreign policy and the end of divisive party politics.

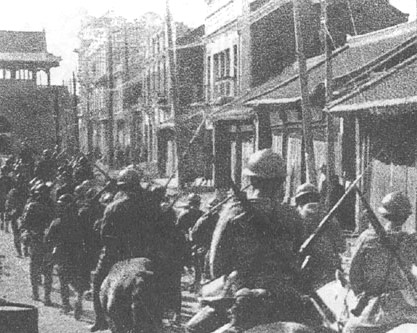
Japanese troops entering Mukden during the Mukden incident, 1931

The turning point was the Mukden incident in September 1931, when the Kwantung Army acted without government authorization to seize Manchuria. The party cabinet of the Minseitō was unable to restrain the military, and the event unleashed a wave of popular nationalism that isolated and undermined the proletarian parties and other anti-imperialist voices. The crisis deepened with a series of assassinations by right-wing extremists targeting key political and business leaders. The assassination of Prime Minister Inukai Tsuyoshi by young naval officers in the May 15 Incident of 1932 effectively ended the era of party government. The genrō Saionji Kinmochi, bowing to the military's refusal to accept a party cabinet, appointed a "national unity" cabinet led by Admiral Saitō Makoto. This marked the end of Taishō Democracy and the beginning of a period dominated by bureaucrats and the military.

== Legacy ==
The Taishō Democracy period, though brief, left a significant legacy for post-World War II Japan. The experience of party government, however flawed, provided the roots for the postwar party system. The conservative parties that dominated postwar politics, such as the Liberal Democratic Party, inherited the political machinery and jiban-based electoral strategies of the pre-war Seiyūkai and Minseitō. Similarly, the postwar Japan Socialist Party built upon the electoral base and organizational experience of the pre-war proletarian parties, with former strongholds of the Social Masses Party, like the Nankatsu district, becoming centers of socialist support for decades.

The vibrant "dispute culture" of the 1920s and 1930s also resurfaced with vigor in the early postwar years. The organizational tactics, demands for worker dignity, and patterns of protest seen in the major strikes of the interwar period were inherited and recreated by the powerful postwar labor movement. This continuity was so strong that it surprised American occupation officials, who were unfamiliar with the deep pre-war roots of Japanese labor activism. The legacy of "imperial democracy" may also be seen in the postwar national consensus that drove Japan's high-speed economic growth, where popular aspirations for national prestige and prosperity were transposed from the military and political realm to the arena of economic competition.

== See also ==
- Keishichi Hirasawa (平澤計七)
- Senji Yamamoto (山本宣治)
- Takiji Kobayashi (小林多喜二)
- Hiratsuka Raichō (平塚らいてう)
- Itō Noe (伊藤野枝)
- Yoshiya Nobuko (吉屋信子)
- Woman's suffrage (女性参政権)
- Minpon Shugi (民本主義)
- Hanshinkan Modernism
