= Era of Popular Violence =

1905–18 wave of violent protests and riots in Japan

The Hibiya Incendiary Incident in September 1905 is considered the beginning of the Era of Popular Violence.

The Era of Popular Violence (Japanese: 民衆騒擾期, minshū sōjō ki) was a series of violent mass protests and riots that occurred in Japan from 1905 to 1918. The Era of Popular Violence is considered to have begun with the Hibiya Incendiary Incident in September 1905 and culminated in the Rice riots of 1918, which lasted from July to September of that year.

== Background ==
From 1600, Japan was under the rule of the Tokugawa shogunate in Edo, known as the Edo period. In the 1630s, the Tokugawa introduced the sakoku policies of national isolationism, limiting Japan's connections with the outside world to Chinese and Dutch traders. The Edo period saw strong political stability and economic growth in Japan until the early 1800s, when interactions with Western ships caused growing dissatisfaction with Tokugawa rule. The technologically superior Western ships were difficult to repel and were able to violate Japan with impunity, and Tokugawa's campaign of modernization to confront them was insufficient.

In 1853, the Perry Expedition triggered a political upheaval in Japan called the Bakumatsu period. Commodore Matthew C. Perry of the United States arrived in Japan with a fleet of ships to forcibly end the centuries-old sakoku policy. In March 1854, Perry pressured the Tokugawa to sign the Convention of Kanagawa, widely perceived in Japan as an "unequal treaty" and a sign of weakness. The prestige and legitimacy of the Shōgun, who ruled with nominal appointment from the Emperor of Japan, was severely damaged to the public. As the convention was signed against the will of the Imperial Court in Kyoto, the de jure ruling authority, the anti-Tokugawa used this as evidence the Shōgun could no longer fulfil the Emperor's will, and therefore no longer fit to rule. In the 1860s, people who blamed the Tokugawa for Japan's "backwardness" and humiliation began agitating for their overthrow and the return of power to the Imperial Court.

In 1868, the anti-Tokugawa launched the Meiji Restoration to restore practical imperial rule in the newly established Empire of Japan, and the Tokugawa were overthrown in the Boshin War the following year. The uncontested Meiji Government began a widespread campaign of reform in Japan, including modernization, westernization, and industrialization. Edo was renamed Tokyo and the city became both the official national capital and new seat of the Imperial House. Feudalism was abolished and political centralization saw the power of the domains progressively eliminated, and the domains themselves were soon transformed into prefectures, whose governors were appointed by the Emperor. In 1895, Japan defeated Qing China in the First Sino-Japanese War, shifting regional dominance in East Asia from China to Japan. The Treaty of Shimonoseki granted Japan sovereignty over the Chinese islands of Formosa (Taiwan) and Penghu (Pescadores), the lease for the Kwantung Leased Territory, and brought Korea into the Japanese sphere of influence.

== Events ==
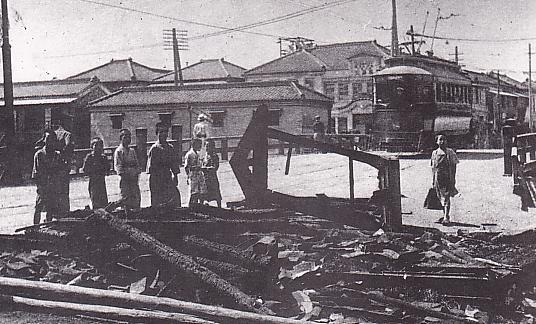
Destruction in Tokyo from the Hibiya Incendiary Incident

By the turn of the 1900s, Japan's economy struggled to match the rapid territorial growth of the empire since the late 1800s.

In February 1904, Japan entered in the Russo-Japanese War against the Russian Empire over competing imperialist interests in Northeast Asia. Japan decisively defeated the Russians and the war officially ended with the signing of the Treaty of Portsmouth on 5 September 1905. A month of negotiations led to the treaty, which saw the return of the Kwantung Leased Territory (governed by the Russians as Russian Dalian since 1898) and the ceding of the island of Sakhalin south of the 50th parallel north. Despite the success of the war, the treaty outraged the Japanese public and sparked protests against terms considered to be too lenient towards the Russians. The protesters were especially incensed that Japanese territorial gains in the Liaodong Peninsula and the northern half of Sakhalin were to be returned to Russia, and that the Russian government would not pay any war reparations to Japan. Unknown to the public, largely ignorant of the actual war situation, the Japanese government had granted Russia these concessions because they feared the economy and military were too overstretched to enforce them. A diverse assortment of activist groups called for a rally at Hibiya Park in central Tokyo to protest the humiliating terms of the treaty, announced earlier that day. Police attempts to suppress the protest escalated into a violent riot known as the Hibiya incendiary incident, considered the first event of the Era of Popular Violence. Rioters targeted buildings associated with the police, Russia, the United States (who helped broker the treaty), and Japan's foreign affairs ministry. The Hibiya incendiary incident lasted until the 7 September, resulting in over 350 buildings damaged or destroyed, 17 people killed, hundreds injured, and led to the collapse of the government of Katsura Tarō in early 1906. Over 2000 were arrested for participation in the riots, with 104 reaching trial and 87 were found guilty of crimes. News of the violence in Tokyo touched off similar disturbances in Kobe and Yokohama, and further stimulated hundreds of nonviolent rallies, speeches, and meetings throughout Japan for the next several months.

Further minor violent protests occurred across Japan over the next thirteen years, with nine different riots in Tokyo alone. The Era of Popular Violence is considered to have culminated with the Rice riots of 1918 that erupted throughout Japan from July to September 1918. A protest in the small fishing town of Uozu escalated into widespread violence due to popular dissatisfaction with post-World War I inflation. People in rural areas began hundreds of labor disputes over anger at the spiralling price of rice, a staple food. Rural people were infuriated by the Japanese government's failed attempts to relieve the problem, and the Siberian Intervention further inflamed the situation as the government bought existing rice stocks to support the troops overseas, driving rice prices even higher. People in urban areas joined the protests over the government's failure to fix inflation on rents and consumer goods as well as rice prices. The violence of the Rice riots of 1918 were unparalleled in modern Japanese history and brought about the collapse of the Terauchi Masatake administration.
