= Hanshinkan Modernism =

Japanese art movement

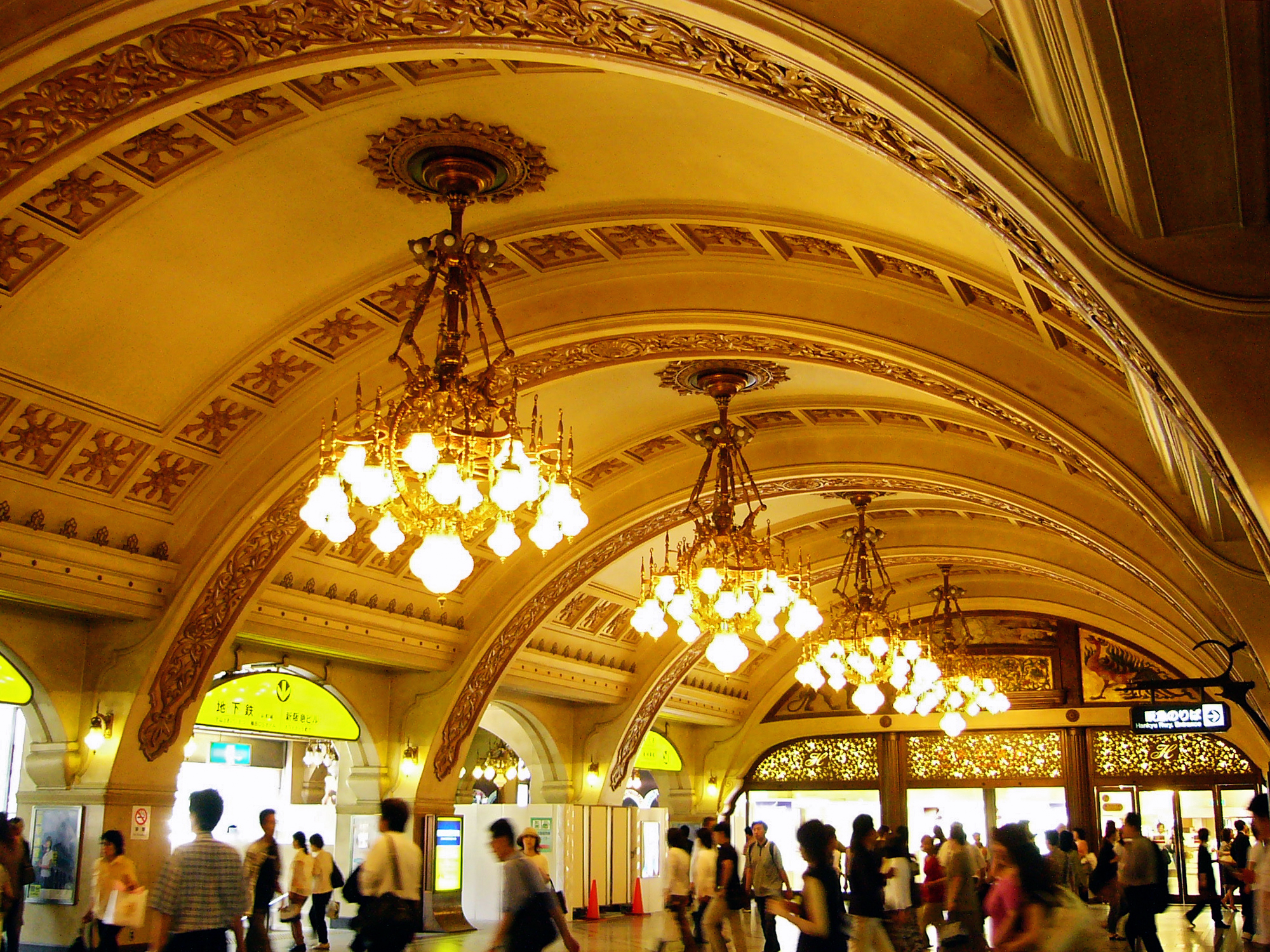
Former Hankyu Umeda Station Concourse in Osaka

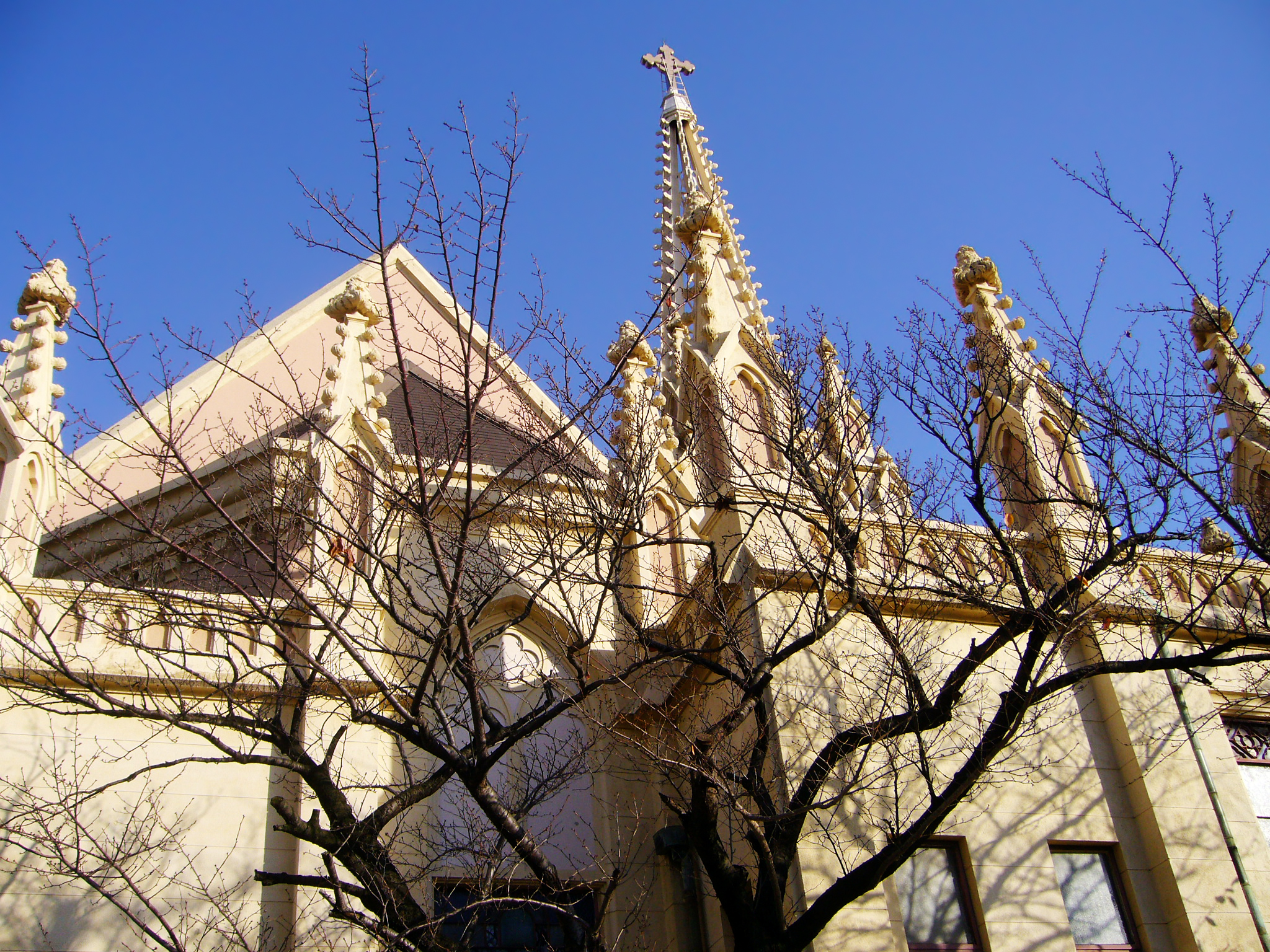
Shukugawa Catholic Church in Nishinomiya

Hanshinkan Modernism (阪神間モダニズム) identifies the modernist arts, culture, and lifestyle that developed from the region of Japan centered primarily on the Hanshinkan conurbation between Osaka and Kobe, the ideally terrained area between the Rokkō Range and the sea (Kobe's Nada and Higashi Nada wards, Ashiya, Takarazuka, Nishinomiya, Itami, Amagasaki, Sanda, and Kawanishi) from the 1900s through the 1930s, or the circumstances of that period.

Accompanying the suburbanization of the Osaka Bay area, which continued to grow after 1923 in contrast to the Tokyo Bay area where the spread of urbanization was temporarily suspended due to the Great Kantō earthquake, the Hanshinkan Modernism cultural sphere spread to Ikeda, Minoh, and Toyonaka in Osaka Prefecture, and to Kobe's Suma and Tarumi wards.

== Meaning ==
"Hanshinkan Modernism" is a concept of regional cultural history that came to be used in works like Lifestyle and Urban Culture: Hanshinkan Modernism Light and Shadow and events like the Hanshinkan Modernism exhibition .

It has become the subject of study for the dawning in this region of cultural phenomena related to the 77-year process of Japan's prewar modernization from the Meiji Restoration to the end of World War II, excluding the postwar reconstruction, rapid economic miracle, bubble economy, etc. occurrences of contemporary postwar Japan.

== History ==
Following the First Sino-Japanese War (1894–1895), Osaka became Japan's largest economic center, and Kobe developed into the largest port city in the Orient. However, due to the industrial expansion of both cities the living conditions in urban areas deteriorated.

At the same time, emulating the example of the United States, the Kinki Region experienced a boom in construction of interurban railway lines. Starting with Hanshin Electric Railway's Main Line (opened in 1905), and continuing with Minoh Arima Electric Railway (later the Hankyū Takarazuka Main Line) (opened in 1910), Hanshin Express Electric Railway's Kōbe Main Line (opened in 1920), and others, the opening of rail lines attracted attention to the undeveloped agricultural areas on the outskirts of Kobe/Hokusetsu, and the development of suburban residential areas aimed at creating a comfortable living environment progressed in areas surrounding the rail lines on the naturally beautiful southern slope of Mount Rokkō, the so-called Hanshinkan area. The urban and cultural development of this area is inseparable from Kansai private railway capital.

First, during the Meiji Period wealthy merchants in the Keihanshin region built luxurious mansions one after the other in the vicinity of Sumiyoshi village (current Higashi Nada ward in Kobe). Development of this area made an opportunity for its expansion from the Taisho Period as a residential area not just for industrialists but also for the then rising college-educated white collar intelligentsia, the non-property-owning middle class. Once the cultural and economic environment was in place, many artists and persons of culture relocated to the area, and hotels and amusement facilities offering a variety of cultural, educational, and social spaces were constructed, forming a major resort area in the one-time vacation home area on the top of Mount Rokko and in the lushly green towns at its base to cater to these wealthy so-called "Bourgeoisie". Then, under the influence of Western culture, these unique lifestyles of enjoyment were born. These have had a great influence on Japanese art, culture, education, food, such as cookies, amusement, and lifestyles to this day. Even today, the area is one of Japan's leading exclusive, brand-name residential areas.

The influence of Hanshinkan Modernism can be seen in Japanese contemporary construction in the Kantō region in Western-style resort facilities and high-class vacation home areas like Karuizawa, and residential suburbs of Tokyo like Den-en-chōfu.

== See also ==
- Taisho democracy
- Shōwa Modan
