= Tenkō =

Forced ideological conversion of leftists in Japan

Tenkō (転向; literally, changing direction) is a Japanese term referring to the coerced ideological conversions of Japanese socialists and communists who, between 1925 and 1945, were induced to renounce leftist ideologies and enthusiastically embrace the Emperor-centric, capitalist, and imperialist ideology favored by the state. Tenkō was typically performed under duress, most often in police custody, and was a condition for release (although surveillance and harassment would often continue thereafter). But it was also a broader phenomenon, a kind of cultural reorientation in the face of national crisis, that did not always involve direct repression.

The prewar Japanese state considered Marxism to be a grave threat to Japan's "national essence" (国体, kokutai). The Peace Preservation Law, passed in 1925, empowered the Special Higher Police (Tokubetsu Kōtō Keisatsu, abbreviated Tokkō) to persecute communists, socialists, and other leftists by explicitly criminalizing criticism of the system of private property. Thus the year 1925 marked a new phase in which the Tokkō targeted not only incorrect action (actual crimes) but also incorrect thought or ideology (thought crime), earning them the nickname, the "Thought Police" (思想警察, Shisō Keisatsu).

In 1927, a sub-bureau, the "Thought Section," was established within the Criminal Affairs Bureau of the Special Higher Police in order to oversee the study and suppression of subversive ideologies. By 1933, ideological conversion had become the main means of enforcing the Peace Preservation Law, rather than judicial punishment. In order to elicit tenkō from prisoners suspected of ideological radicalism, the police employed physical torture, as well as psychological torture and familial pressure.

One of the most consequential instances of tenkō came in June 1933, when Sano Manabu (1892—1953) and Nabeyama Sadachika (1901—1979), two leading figures in the Japan Communist Party, renounced their allegiance to the Comintern and the policy of violent revolution, and committed to supporting only those forms of social change that might be consonant with Japan's "national essence." Their proclamation was followed by a wave of defections from the party, signaling the demise of the party organization, except in exile.

In the postwar period, whether someone had succumbed to pressure (or torture) and committed tenkō became, among leftists, a sort of ideological litmus test and a form of stigma attached to the careers of left-leaning politicians, artists, and intellectuals active before and after the war. In the immediate aftermath of the war, many of these leftists attempted to atone for their wartime tenkō by undertaking "self-reflection" (hansei), and often re-embracing Marxism and/or communism with even greater fervor than before. These figures were often spoken of as having undergone a "re-conversion" or "second tenkō" back to their original ideological stance. More broadly, the term tenkō also came to serve as a metonym for the collective experience of an entire generation of Japanese, first in turning toward support of militarism and imperialism before the war, and then again in turning toward supporting peace and democracy in the postwar.

== See also ==
- Kokutai
- Special Higher Police
- Statism in Shōwa Japan
- Peace Preservation Law
- Socialist thought in Imperial Japan
- Japanese dissidence during the Shōwa period
- Political repression in Imperial Japan
