= Peace Preservation Law =

1925 law of the Empire of Japan

Peace Preservation Law 治安維持法
- Title page of the Peace Preservation Law, 1925

National Diet of Japan
- Citation: Imperial Ordinance No. 46 of 1925
- Territorial extent: Empire of Japan
- Passed by: National Diet of Japan
- Passed: April 22, 1925
- Repealed: October 15, 1945
- Status: Repealed

The Peace Preservation Law (治安維持法, Chian iji hō) was a Japanese law enacted on April 22, 1925, with the aim of allowing the Special Higher Police to more effectively suppress alleged socialists and communists. In addition to criminalizing forming an association with the aim of altering the kokutai ("national essence") of Japan, the law also explicitly criminalized criticism of the system of private property and became the centerpiece of a broad apparatus of thought control in Imperial Japan. Altogether, more than 70,000 people were arrested under the provisions of the law until its repeal by Allied occupation authorities at the end of World War II.

== Passage ==
Following the Russian Revolution of 1917, socialist and communist ideas began spreading in Japan, and the government became increasingly concerned that socialism and communism represented a threat to the emperor system and Japan's divine kokutai (国体, "national essence"). The 1918 Rice Riots and the assassination of Prime Minister Hara Kei only deepened concerns that dangerous ideas were spreading through society. Efforts to pass a Peace Preservation Law began within the Diet as early as 1921, and gathered momentum after the formation of the Japan Communist Party in 1922, although opposition to the law remained strong. Finally, the law was passed in 1925, in conjunction with the passage of the Universal Manhood Suffrage Law (普通選挙法, Futsū Senkyo Hō), which allowed all male citizens to vote in elections, regardless of wealth or status. Fears that newly enfranchised working-class voters might vote for socialists or communists played an important role in overcoming earlier opposition to the law.

== Provisions ==
The law provided:

Anyone who has formed an association with the aim of altering the kokutai or the system of private property, and anyone who has joined such an association with full knowledge of its object, shall be liable to imprisonment with or without hard labor, for a term not exceeding ten years.

By using the highly vague and subjective term kokutai, the law attempted to blend politics and ethics, but the result was that any political opposition could be branded as "altering the kokutai". Thus the government had carte blanche to outlaw any form of dissent.

== Consequences ==
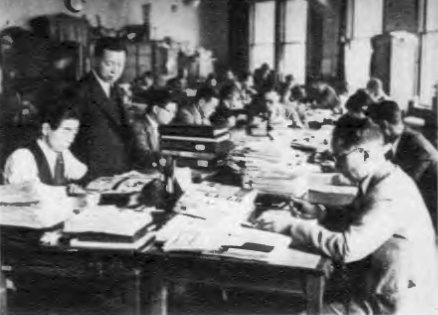
The Special Higher Police bureau, Censorship Section of the Tokyo Metropolitan Police Department

In 1927, a sub-bureau, the "Thought Section", was established within the Criminal Affairs Bureau of the Special Higher Police within the Home Ministry in order to make use of the new legal authority granted by the Peace Preservation Law to ferret out and suppress subversive ideologies. The new "Thought Police" established local branches throughout Japan as well as in Japan's overseas territories to monitor dangerous thoughts and ideologies among Japan's imperial subjects. A "Student Section" was also established within the Ministry of Education to monitor subversive thought among university professors and students. Within the Ministry of Justice, special "Thought Prosecutors" (思想検事, shisō kenji) were appointed to suppress "thought crime" (思想犯, shisō han; not to be confused with thoughtcrime in Nineteen Eighty-Four).

Renewed underground activity by the banned Japan Communist Party in 1928 led to the March 15 incident, in which police arrested more than 1,600 Communists and suspected Communists under the provisions of the Peace Preservation Law. The same year, the highly anti-Communist government of Tanaka Giichi pushed through an amendment to the law, raising the maximum penalty from ten years to death.

In 1932, Kyoto Imperial University law professor Takigawa Yukitoki was forced to resign by Education Minister Hatoyama Ichiro who invoked the law as justification. The event showed the widespread use of the law, as Yukitoki was a liberal, not a communist.

By 1933, coerced "ideological conversions" (転向, tenkō) had become the main means of enforcing the Peace Preservation Law, rather than judicial punishment. In order to elicit tenkō from prisoners suspected of ideological radicalism, the police employed physical torture, as well as psychological torture and familial pressure.

Japan's law enforcement was met with a mass of offenders that were educated and politically engaged.The Justice Ministry adopted Tenkō before a suspect's trial or imprisonment as a time of repentance for their "thought crime".Offenders could earn parole by signing a statement of Tenkō, confession of their ideological conversion, and return to society.

Beside law enforcement, civil service prison chaplains and Buddhist priests were involved in the ideological conversion process. Fujii Eshō, a prison chaplain and vice director of the monthly journal Hogo Jihō (meaning Aid and Guidance), sought thought crime as a religious issue and encouraged offenders to focus on private manners such as familial relationships, establishing faith in Pure Land Buddhist principles (Jōdo Shinshū), and loyalty to the emperor instead of political engagement in Marxism. Tenkō conversions was a central tool for the Peace Preservation Law to function and eradicate Marxism, which allowed an expansion of nationalism in Japan.

In the 1930s, with Japan's increasing militarism and totalitarianism, dissent was tolerated less and less. In early February 1941, the original Peace Preservation Law of 1925 was heavily amended to make punishments even more severe. Terms for people suspected of socialist and communist sympathies were made harsher, and for the first time religious organizations were included within the purview of the Thought Police. In addition, the appeals court for thought crimes was abolished, and the Ministry of Justice given the right to appoint defense attorneys in cases of thought crime. The new provisions became effective on May 15, 1941.

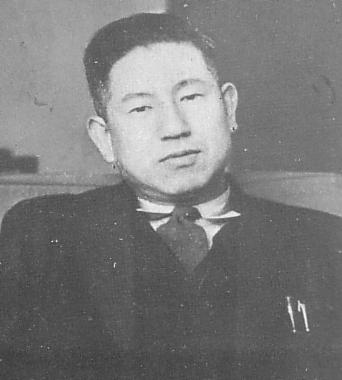
Hotsumi Ozaki, who was hanged under the provisions of the Peace Preservation Law

Between 1926 and 1935, 17,621 people in Korea were arrested under the law and 5,075 were convicted. From 1925 through 1945, over 70,000 people were arrested under the provisions of the Peace Preservation Law, but only about 10% reached trial, and the death penalty was imposed on only two offenders, spy Richard Sorge and his informant, Hotsumi Ozaki. The Peace Preservation Law was repealed following the end of World War II by the American occupation authorities. The repeal was effected on October 15, 1945.

== Works cited ==
- Scalapino, Robert; Lee, Chong-Sik (1972). Communism in Korea: Part 1: The Movement. University of California Press. ISBN 0520020804.
