= Hibiya incendiary incident =

1905 riots in Tokyo

Demonstrators in Hibiya Park during the Hibiya incendiary incident

The Hibiya riots, known in Japanese as the Hibiya burning incident (日比谷焼打事件, Hibiya yakiuchi jiken), was a major riot that occurred in Tokyo, Japan, from 5 to 7 September 1905. Protests by Japanese nationalists in Hibiya Park against the terms of the Treaty of Portsmouth ending the Russo-Japanese War escalated into a violent two-day citywide riot when the police attempted to suppress the protests. The Hibiya riot resulted in the death of 17 rioters, led to the collapse of the government of Katsura Tarō, and is considered the first event of the Era of Popular Violence and the "first major social protest of the age of 'imperial Democracy' in Japan". Over 2,000 rioters were later arrested for their involvement, with 104 being tried and 87 found guilty.

== Background ==
Between the 1870s and 1890s, there was significant social transformation in Japanese society in the aftermath of the Meiji Restoration. Gordon writes, "The establishment of a constitutional political order with a legitimate if circumscribed national assembly, the evolution of a capitalist, industrializing economy and Japan's emergence as an imperial power in Asia were the three great, related changes which conditioned the emergence of the crowd." This created the social conditions for a large, urban population with increasing political consciousness.

Hibiya park was opened in 1903 in the style of Western city parks, offering a green public space. Built for the people, the park was part of the modernization of Japanese society, but this would worked against the interest of the government. Gordon writes, "In their anger at being excluded, the crowd asserted that Hibiya Park belonged to the people, not the state."

The Empire of Japan and the Russian Empire fought the Russo-Japanese War from February 1904 to September 1905 after decades of growing tensions over competing imperialist interests in Northeast Asia. Although the Imperial Japanese Navy had decisively defeated the Imperial Russian Navy at the Battle of Tsushima, and the Imperial Japanese Army had taken Port Arthur and had won a major victory over the Imperial Russian Army at the Battle of Mukden, Japanese forces were overextended in Manchuria, and the Japanese economy could no longer sustain a prolonged war effort. To pay for the expensive war, the government of Japan purchased bonds from London and increased taxes on a range of products, including "cooking oil, sugar, salt, soy sauce, sake, tobacco, and wool." Japan did not have significant enough of an advantage to demand damages from Russia as a part of a peace treaty.

On 5 September 1905, the Treaty of Portsmouth was signed after a month of negotiations between Japan and Russia, officially ending the Russo-Japanese War with a Japanese victory. A diverse assortment of Japanese activist groups called for a rally at Hibiya Park, in central Tokyo, to protest what was seen as the humiliating terms of the treaty, which was announced earlier that day. Gordon writes, "Because the Japanese public had been bombarded with reports of victory after victory, expectations of a profitable peace settlement were high and the outrage when this did not materialize was enormous."

The activists and protesters were largely ignorant of the actual war situation, with many viewing the terms of the treaty accepted by the Japanese government as excessively lenient towards Russia, which had been decisively defeated. The protesters were especially incensed that Japanese territorial gains in the northern half of Sakhalin would be returned to Russia and that the Russian government would not pay any war reparations to Japan.

At the time, very few Japanese people realized that the war against Russia had pushed their nation to the verge of bankruptcy.

== Riots ==
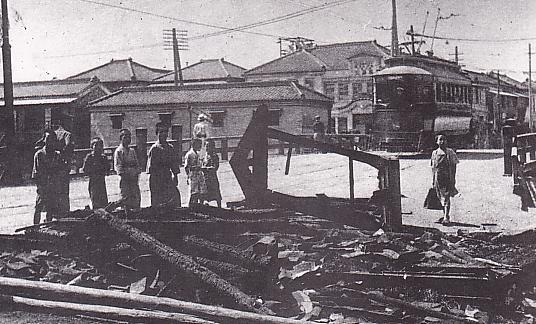
Aftermath of the Hibiya incendiary incident

A crowd of protestors against the government began to gather at Hibiya Park early in the evening of 5 September, only to find that the Tokyo Metropolitan Police Department had banned the rally and barricaded the park's gates. The crowd swelled to about 30,000 people, but the police still refused to open the gates.

The angered crowd then turned riotous, marched towards the Imperial Palace grounds, and rampaged throughout city for the next two days. Rioters especially targeted buildings and organizations associated with the government, the police, Russia, and the United States, which had mediated the terms in the Treaty of Portsmouth. Facilities of the Ministry of Foreign Affairs were damaged, numerous police stations and police boxes were set on fire and destroyed, and a five-person group attacked the house of the Home Minister. Protestors had attempted to set fire to the Holy Resurrection Cathedral of the Japanese Orthodox Church, which was heavily associated with Russia, but were prevented by people guarding the building. Several assets of the American diplomatic mission in Tokyo and American missionary churches were vandalized by protestors.

On 6 September, the government declared martial law.

== Aftermath ==
Before order was finally restored on 7 September, angry mobs had destroyed or damaged more than 350 buildings, including 70 percent of the police boxes in the city.

Casualties included 17 people killed, and over 450 policemen, 48 firemen, and civilians injured. Over 2,000 were arrested for participation in the riots, with 104 being tried and 87 found guilty.

Inspired by the riot in Tokyo, smaller riots took place in Kobe and Yokohama. The incident stimulated hundreds of nonviolent rallies, speeches, and meetings throughout Japan for several months. Martial law would be abolished on 29 November.

The Hibiya riots and the subsequent unrest directly contributed to the collapse of Japanese Prime Minister Katsura Tarō and his cabinet on 7 January 1906. Katsura was replaced by his political archrival, Saionji Kinmochi, who tried to diminish the influence of the Imperial Japanese Army in political matters.

The Hibiya Incendiary Incident marks the beginning of a period in Japanese history that historians call the Era of Popular Violence (民衆騒擾期, minshū sōjō ki). Over the next 13 years, Japan would be rocked by a series of violent protests (nine different riots in Tokyo alone) that culminated in the rice riots of 1918.

== Bibliography ==
- Shumpei Okamoto: The Emperor and the Crowd: the Historical Significance of the Hibiya Riot; In: Tetsuo Najita, J. Victor Koschmann (Hrsg.): Conflict in Modern Japanese History: The Neglected Tradition (engl.), Princeton University Press, 1982, ISBN 0-691-10137-X
