= Hibiya Park =

Park in Chiyoda City, Tokyo, Japan

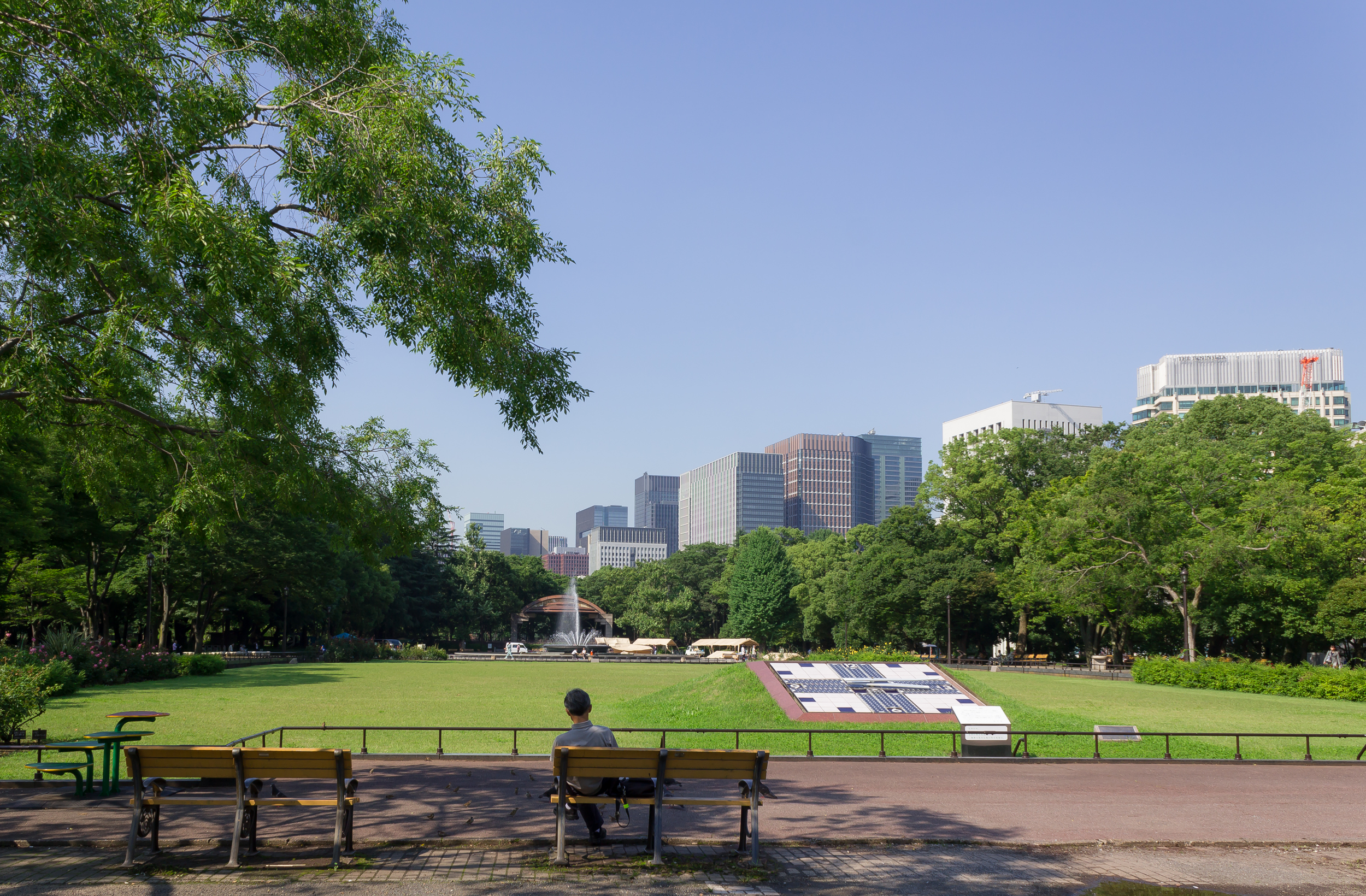
- Interactive map of Hibiya Park
- Location: Chiyoda, Tokyo, Japan
- Coordinates: 35°40′25.3″N 139°45′21.8″E
- Area: 161,636.66 square metres (39.94129 acres)
- Created: 1903

Hibiya Park (Japanese: 日比谷公園, Hibiya Kōen) is a park in Chiyoda, Tokyo, Japan. It covers an area of 161,636.66 m^{2} (40 acres) between the east gardens of the Imperial Palace to the north, the Shinbashi district to the southeast and the Kasumigaseki government district to the west.

== History ==
Originally an inlet of the sea ran northwards to a cove at present-day Hibiya and Kokyo Gaien plaza, into which the Kanda River flowed. During the rule of the shogun Tokugawa Hidetada, the river was diverted to flow into the Sumida River, with the spoil from the diversion used to reclaim the cove at Hibiya.

The land was occupied by the estates of the Mōri clan and Nabeshima clan during the Edo period. It was used for army maneuvers during the Meiji period. It was converted to a park and opened to the public on June 1, 1903.

On September 5, 1905, a protest at the park against the Treaty of Portsmouth, which ended the Russo-Japanese War (1904−1905), erupted into the Hibiya riots. The major citywide riots lasted two days, with seventeen people being killed and 331 arrested, as well a large amount of property damage. The riots were against the terms of the treaty, which were lenient to Russia, but also against bureaucrats who refused to accept the will of the people on foreign policy.

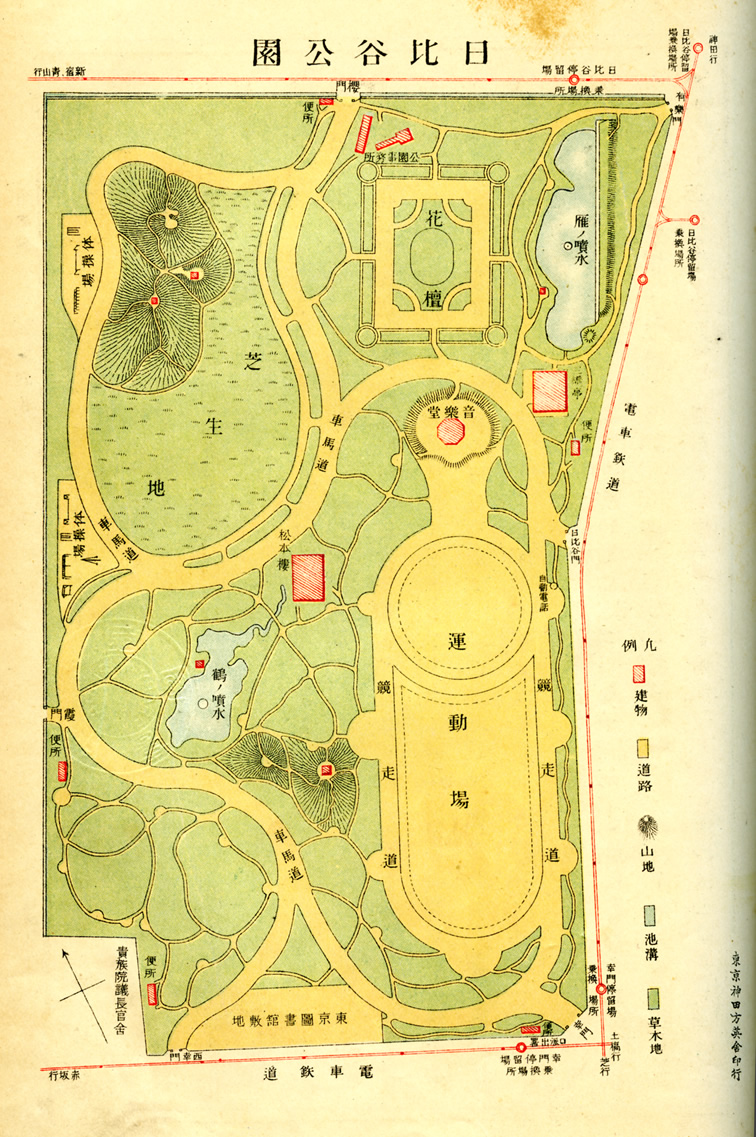
The park's plan in 1907

The park is famous for the Shisei Kaikan (市政会館), a brick building built in Gothic style in 1929, which once housed the Domei Tsushin state wire service and its postwar successors Kyodo News and Jiji Press. The park is also home to the Kubi-kake Ginkgo (首かけ銀杏), a ginkgo tree that is about 500 years old and almost cost the park's designer his job when he fought to save the tree in 1901.

The park is also known for its open-air concert venue, Hibiya Open-Air Concert Hall (日比谷野外音楽堂), commonly known as Yaon (野音), as well as for its tennis courts (for which reservations are hotly contested because of their proximity to the financial and government districts). World War II took a toll on the park when almost all the trees and fencing were used for the war effort.

The large fountain from 1961 that dominates the park is currently being replaced. The town hall plans to complete the demolition work by July 2025 and aims to complete the new fountain by the end of the year.

== Surrounding buildings ==
- Attorneys' Hall (Japan Federation of Bar Associations headquarters)
- Fukoku Seimei Building
- Imperial Hotel, Tokyo
- Ministry of the Environment
- Ministry of Health, Labour and Welfare
- Ministry of Justice
- Mizuho Bank Building
- Nissay Theatre
- NTT Hibiya Building
- Shinsei Bank Building
- Sumitomo Mitsui Banking Corporation Building

== Education ==
Chiyoda Board of Education operates public elementary and junior high schools. Chiyoda Elementary School (千代田小学校) is the zoned elementary of Hibiya Park. There is a freedom of choice system for junior high schools in Chiyoda Ward, and so there are no specific junior high school zones.

== Gallery ==
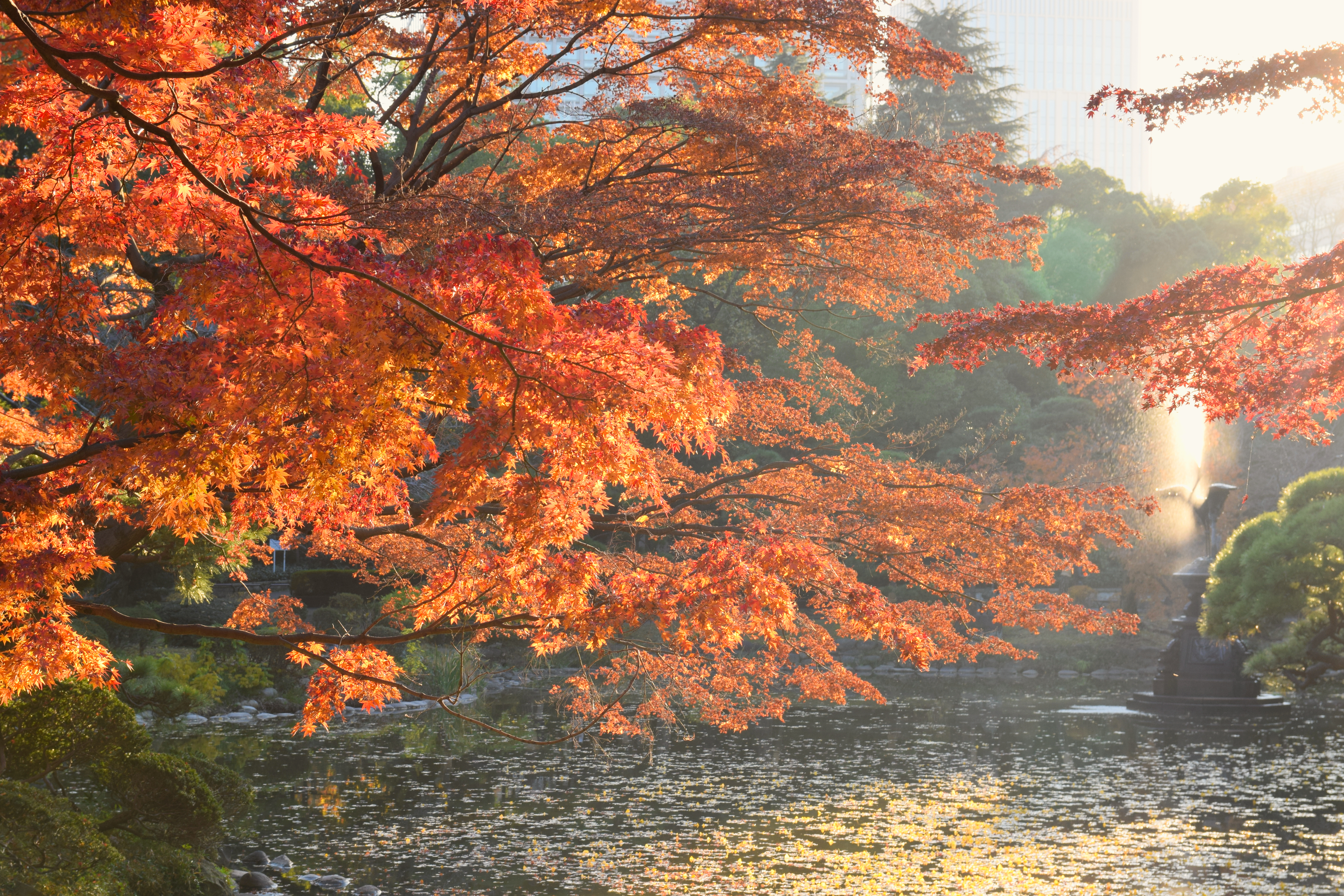
One of the ponds in the park

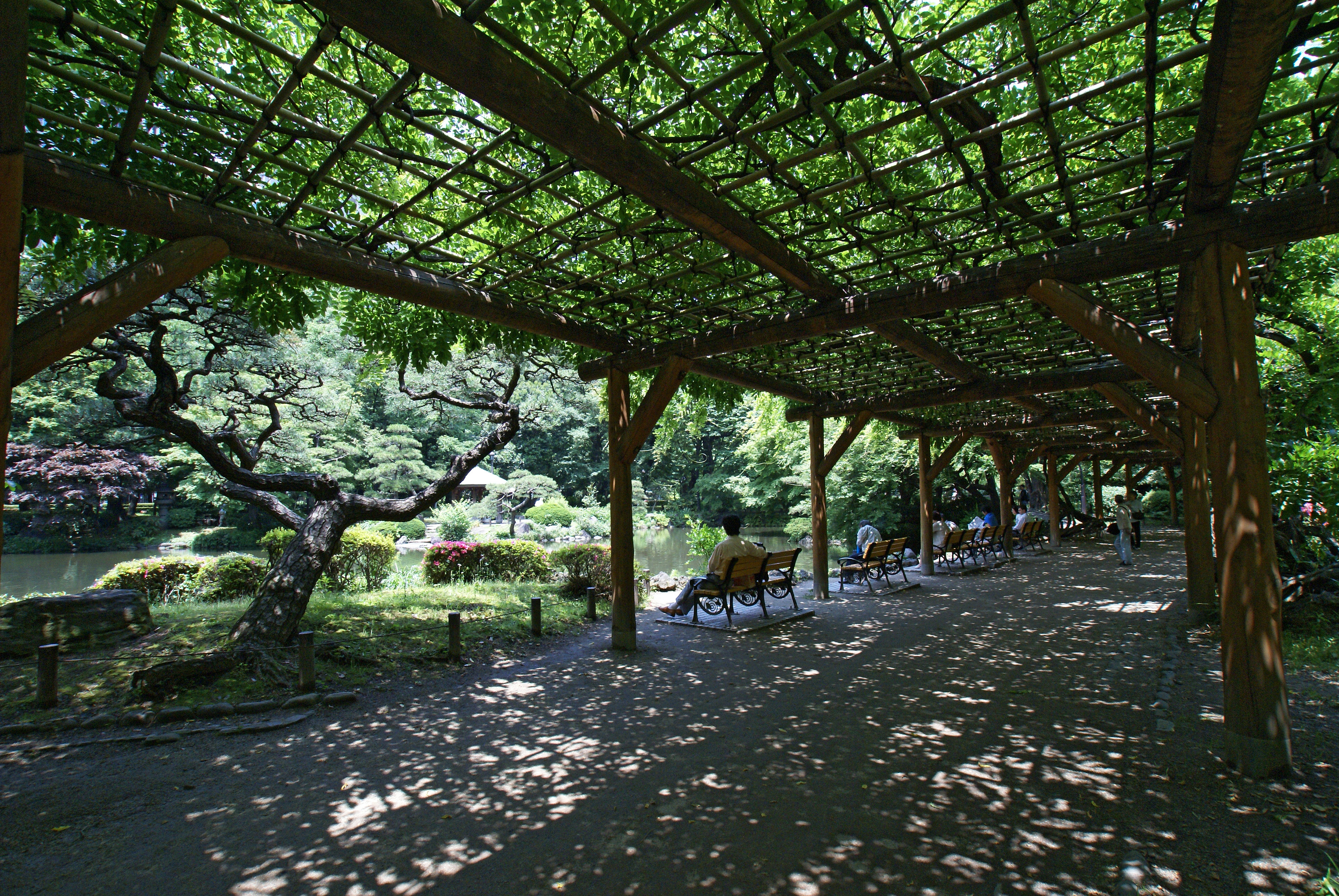
Hibiya Park Lake and Wisteria Grove

A few scenes inside the park on an autumn day, 2023

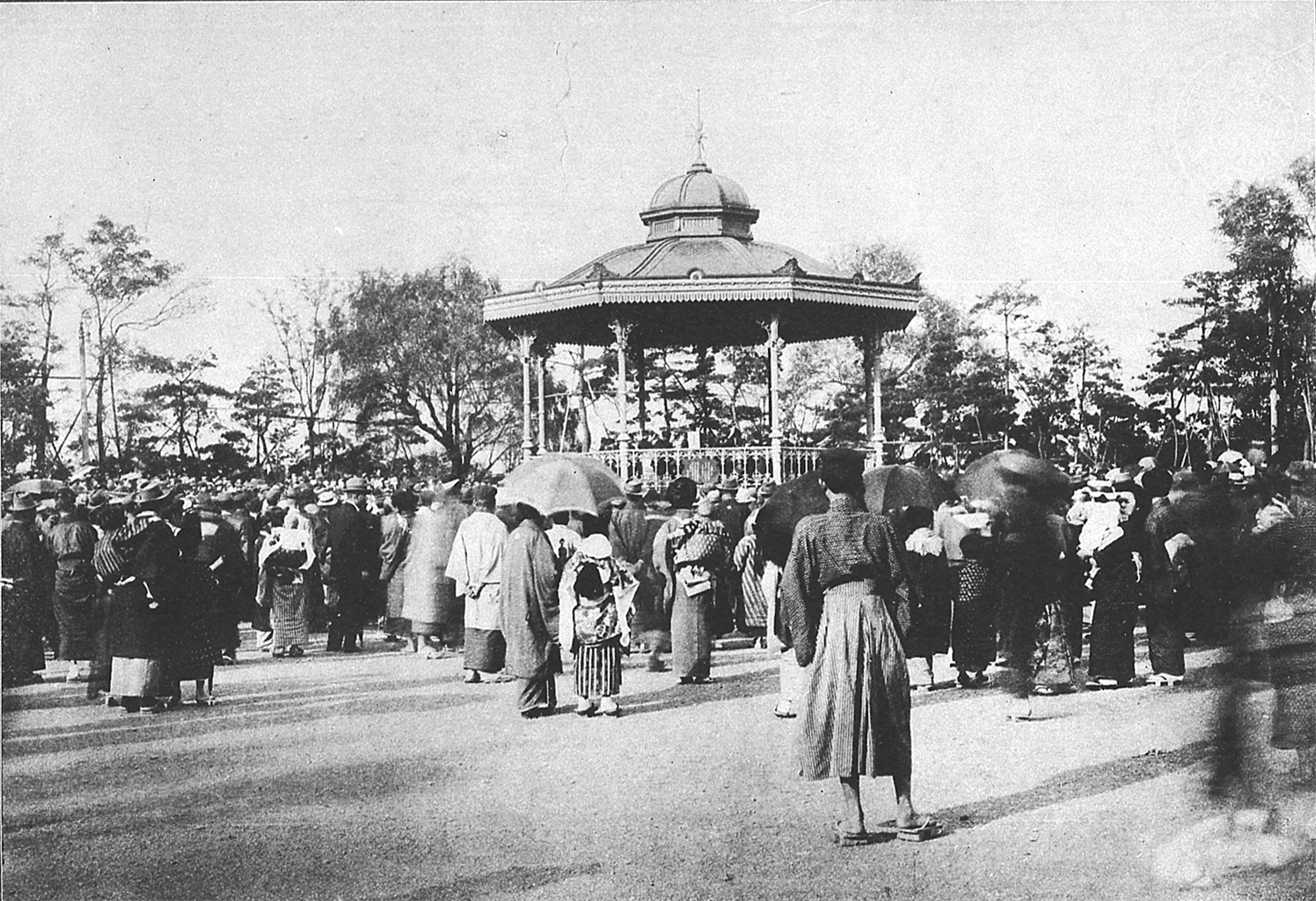
Ongaku-do, Hibiya Park, Tokyo, 1909

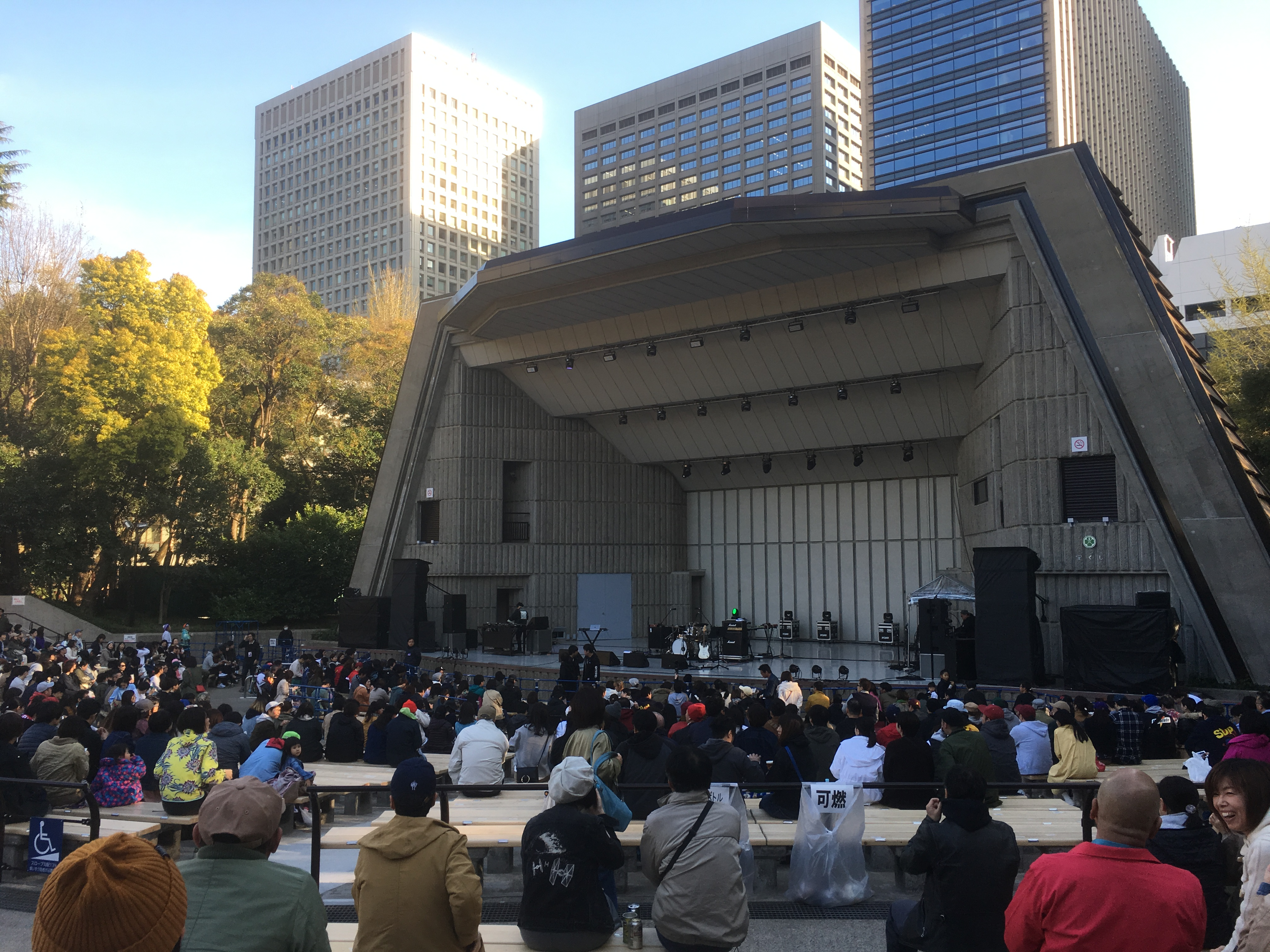
Hibiya Open-Air Concert Hall

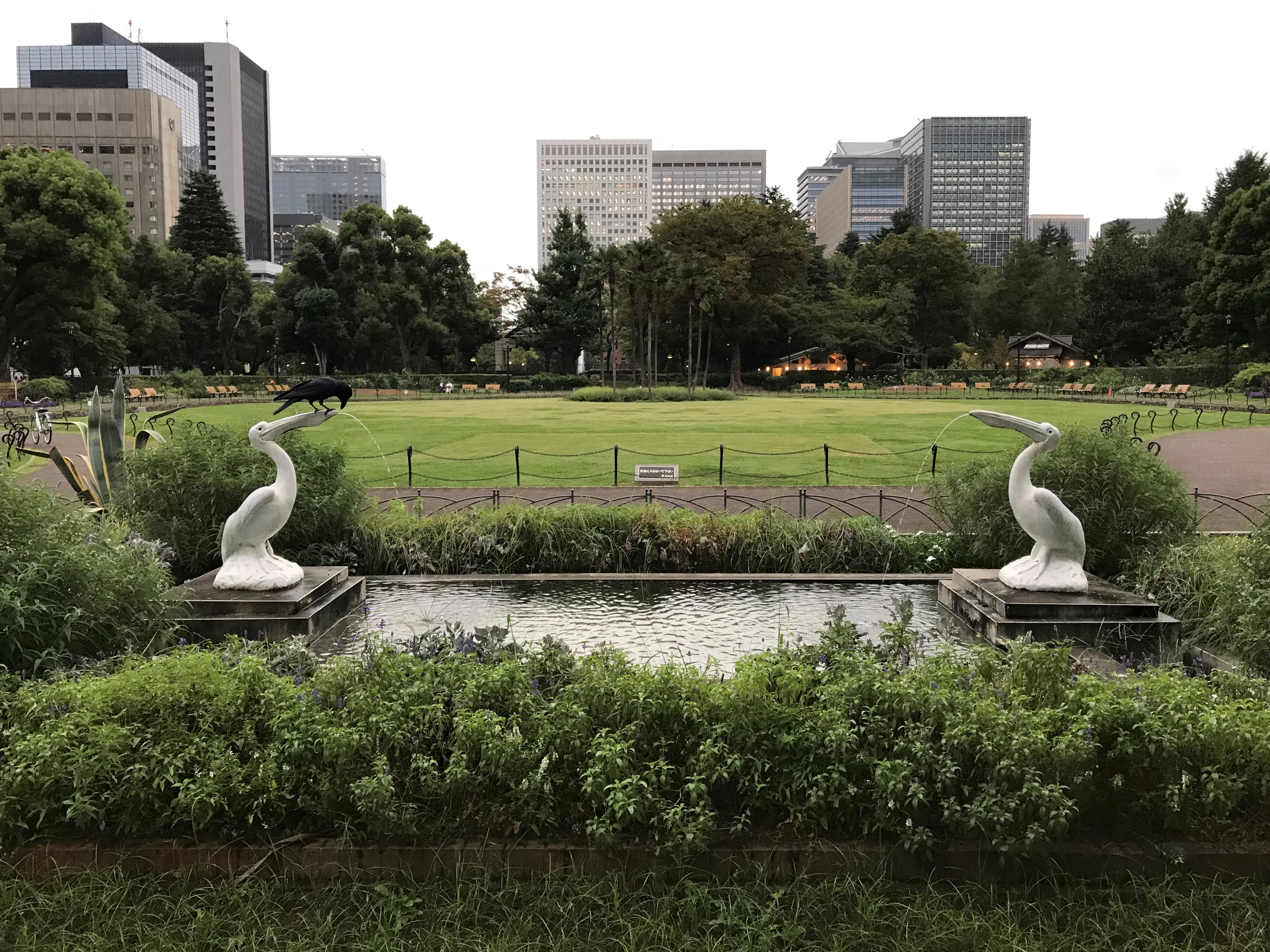
The Pelican Fountain

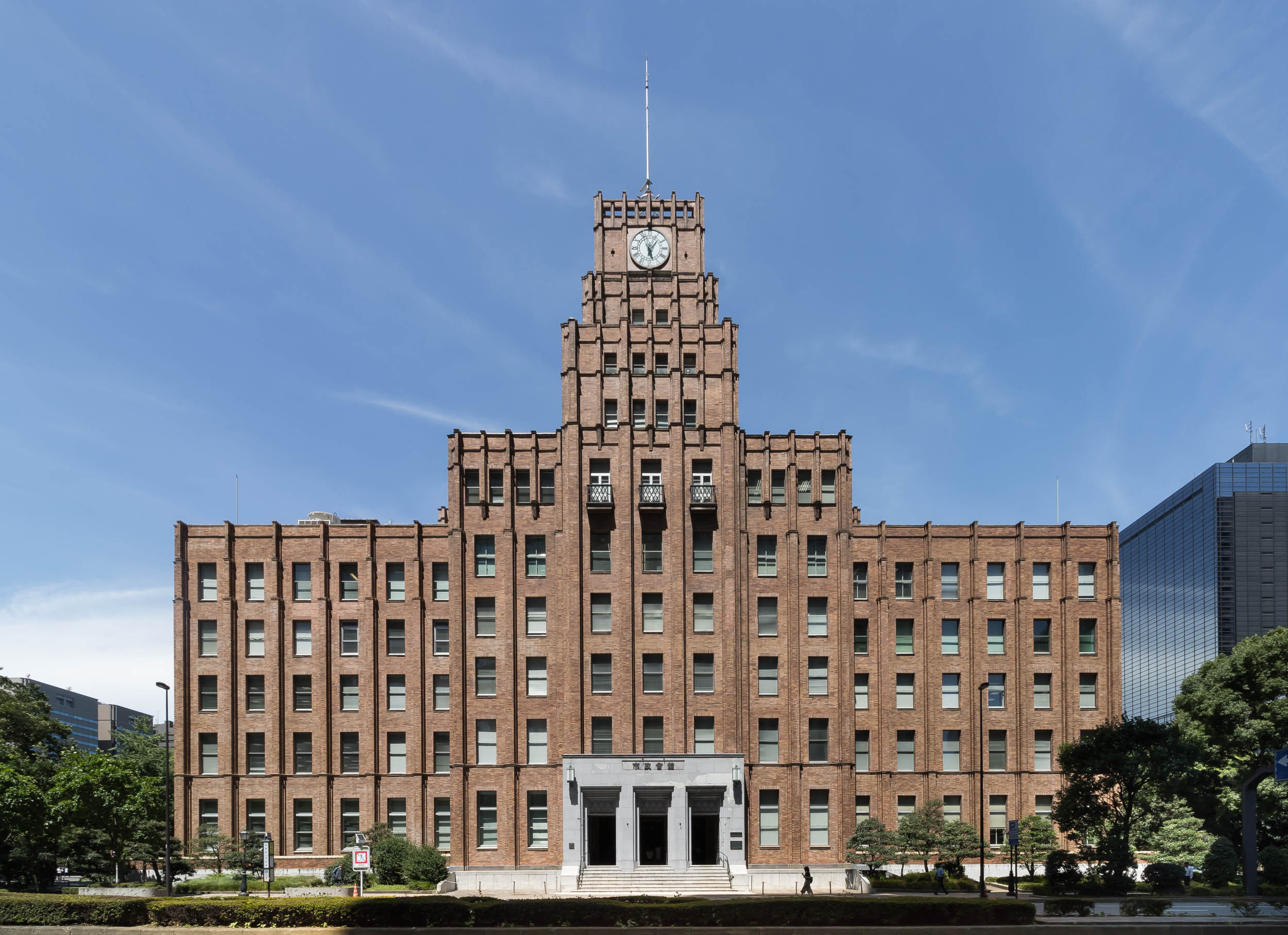
Tokyo Municipal Research Building

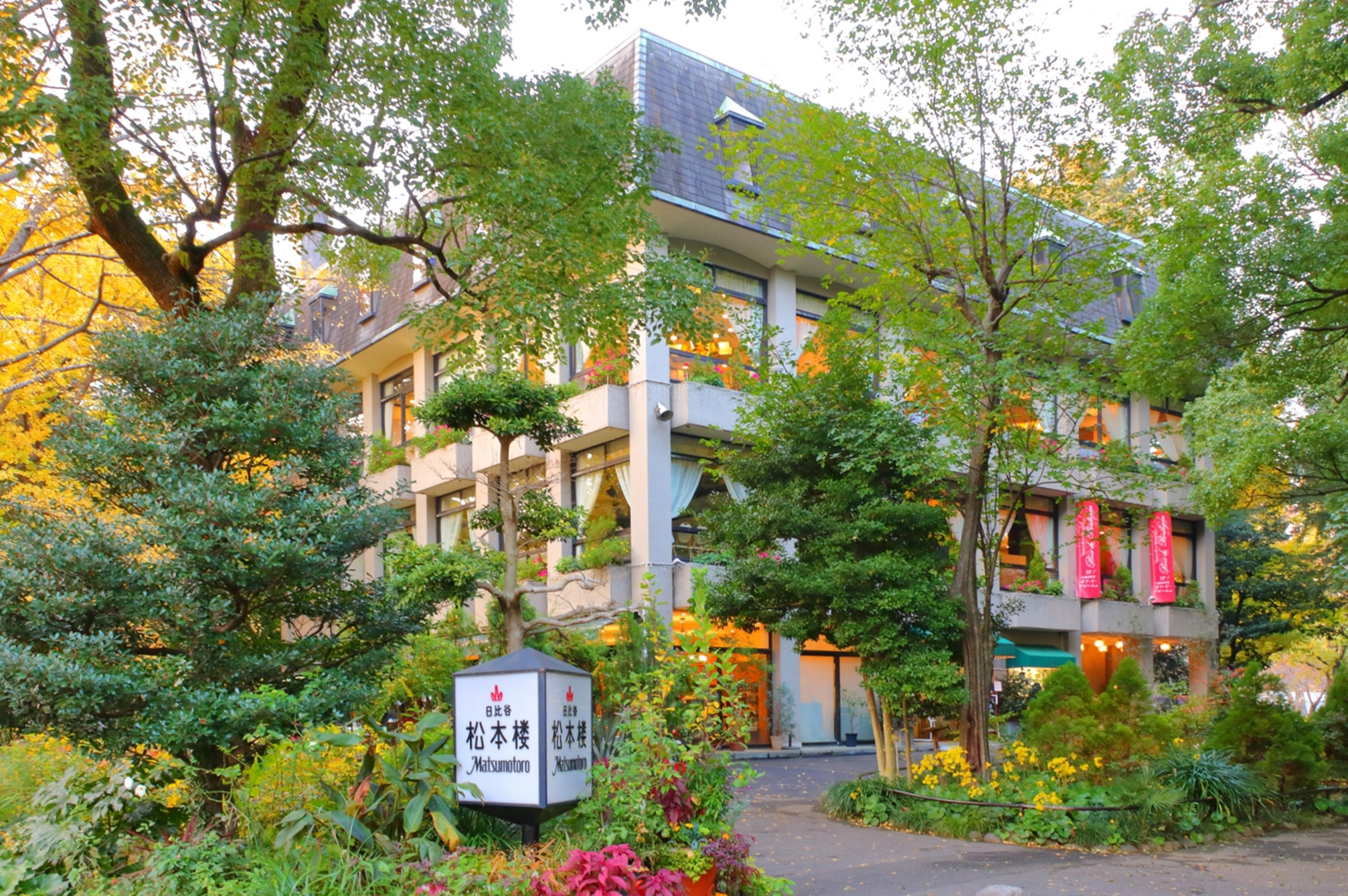
Matsumoto-ro restaurant

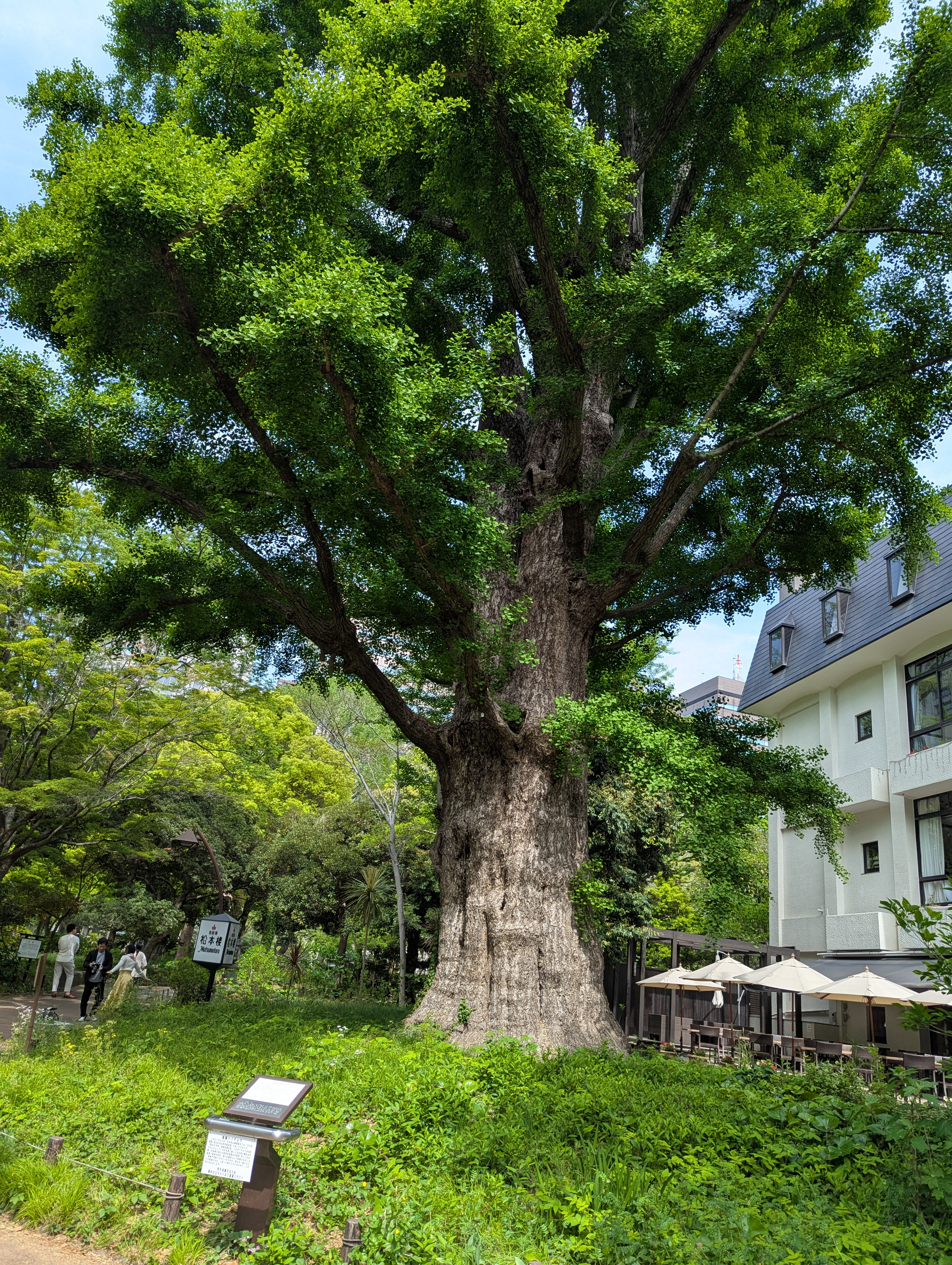
The Kubi-kake ginkgo tree (首かけ銀杏)

Preceded by none	Emperor's Cup Final Venue 1921	Succeeded by Toshima-shihan Ground Tokyo
