= Universal Manhood Suffrage Law =

1925 law in Japan

The Universal Manhood Suffrage Law (普通選挙法, Futsū Senkyo Hō) was a law passed in Taishō period Japan, extending suffrage to all males aged 25 and over in accordance with the principle of universal manhood suffrage, also known as "one man, one vote". Proposed by the Kenseitō political party, the law was enacted thanks to activism by the Universal Suffrage Movement in Japan and decades of organizing by the Universal Suffrage League. It was passed by the Diet of Japan on 29 March, 1925, before being promulgated on 5 May of the same year.

The law increased the electorate from 3,341,000 to 12,534,360.

== Background ==
Meiji period Japan was dominated by the Meiji oligarchy, who viewed popular democracy and party politics with suspicion. However, after the promulgation of the Meiji Constitution, limited suffrage was extended to male property holders, aged over 25 years, who paid more than 15 Yen in annual taxes for elections to the lower house starting in 1890. The number of voters who qualified under this restriction was around 450,000 (roughly 1 percent of the population). Over the next three decades, the number grew to around 3,000,000. Many executive and legislative positions in the Japanese government were appointive, rather than elected. Although seats in local, prefecture and the national (lower) assemblies were elected, the House of Peers was composed of both appointed and hereditary members, and prefectural governors were appointed by the central government and answerable only to the Home Ministry. City mayors were appointed by the prefectural governor, albeit from a list of names supplied by the city elected assembly.

== Universal Suffrage Movement ==
Almost from the start of elections in Japan, popular movements arose to eliminate the tax-paying requirement, which effectively disenfranchised a large segment of the adult male population. In 1897, the Universal Suffrage League (普通選挙期成同盟会, Futsu Senkyo Kisei Dōmeikai) was created to raise public awareness through discussion groups and periodicals. Diet members, mostly from liberal faction within the Diet, supported by the Liberal Party of Japan (Jiyuto) and its offshoots, presented bills to the Diet in 1902, 1903, 1908, 1909 and 1910. The movement finally appeared to succeed in March 1911, when its Universal Suffrage Bill was passed by the lower house, only to be summarily rejected by the House of Peers.

Increased government hostility towards radical groups broadened in the 1910s, with the implementation of the Peace Preservation Laws and increased censorship and surveillance of suspected radical groups associated with leftist or labor movements. However, the movement for universal suffrage resurfaced in 1918–1919 with demonstrations held by student and labor associations and a sudden upsurge in interest by newspapers and popular journals. The opposition political parties, the Kenseikai and Rikken Kokumintō, jumped on the bandwagon, whereas the governmental Rikken Seiyūkai still opposed.

The liberal parties favored an increase in the popular franchise to keep up with the world trend towards democracy and to provide a safety valve for both urban and rural discontent. The more conservative parties, fearing that the increased voter base would favor their liberal opponents, resisted these proposals.

In 1924, a Kenseikai alliance with the Seiyukai scored a victory over the non-party government of Kiyoura Keigo. Kenseikai leader Katō Takaaki became Prime Minister of Japan, and the Seiyukai was forced to accept the Kenseikai proposal on extending universal male suffrage to all male citizens over the age of 25 as the price for the coalition. The bill was passed in 1925, and came into effect for the 20 February 1928 elections.

== Criticisms ==
The Universal Manhood Suffrage Law was passed only after the Peace Preservation Law was passed. Although more democracy was given, liberty (in terms of freedom of the press, freedom of assembly and freedom of speech) was limited at the same time.

Women still did not have the right to vote, as suffrage was only extended to them in 1946.

== See also ==
- Universal manhood suffrage
- 1928 Japanese general election
