= Ken Harada =

Ken Harada may refer to:

- Ken Harada (diplomat) (died 1973), former special envoy from Japan to the Holy See
- Ken Harada (politician) (1919–1997), former member of the Diet of Japan
