= Haraguchi =

Haraguchi (written: 原口 lit. "field entrance") is a Japanese surname. Notable people with the surname include:

- Akira Haraguchi (原口 證; born 1946), Japanese engineer known for memorizing and reciting Pi digits
- Genki Haraguchi (原口 元気; born 1991), Japanese footballer
- Kazuhiro Haraguchi (原口 一博; born 1959), Japanese politician
- Koichi Haraguchi (原口 幸市; 1940–2009), Japanese diplomat
- Kozo Haraguchi (原口 幸三; 1910–2011), Japanese sprinter

== See also ==
- 17933 Haraguchi, a main-belt asteroid
