= Saneatsu Tokudaiji =

Japanese nobleman (1889–1970)

- 徳大寺 実厚
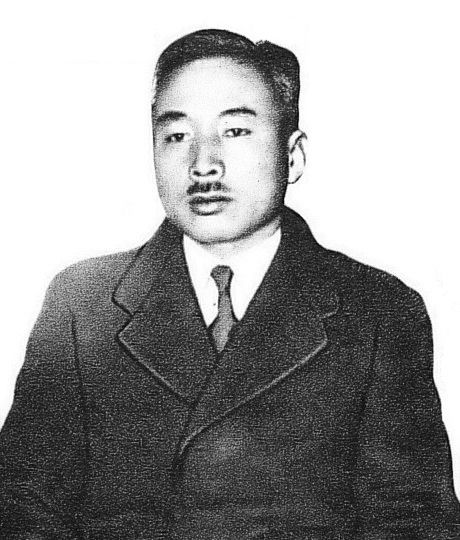

Member of the House of Peers
- In office 1 March 1937 – 8 May 1946 Hereditary peerage

Personal details
- Born: 10 December 1889 Nishikichō, Tokyo, Japan
- Died: 15 March 1970 (aged 80) Bunkyō, Tokyo, Japan
- Spouse: Yoneko Matsudaira
- Children: 4, including Yoshiko and Kinhide
- Parent(s): Tokudaiji Kinhiro; Hisako Matsudaira
- Relatives: Tokudaiji family

Prince Saneatsu Tokudaiji (徳大寺 実厚, Tokudaiji Saneatsu; 10 December 1889 – 15 March 1970) was a Japanese nobleman.

== Biography ==
In 1932, Tokudaiji began serving as a Chamberlain for Emperor Shōwa. From 1937, he served as a Prince of the House of Peers. During World War II, he served as a lieutenant colonel. In 1946, he resigned as a member of the House of Peers.

== Personal life ==
Tokudaiji was married to Yoneko Matsudaira. Their daughter Yoshiko was married to Kōshō Ōtani.
