= Yasumasa Matsudaira =

- 松平 康昌
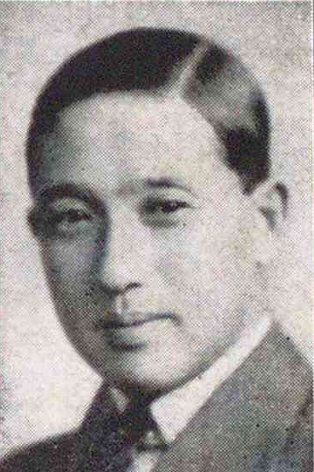

Member of the House of Peers
- In office 15 December 1930 – 2 May 1947 Hereditary peerage

Personal details
- Born: 12 November 1893 Bunkyō, Tokyo, Japan
- Died: 4 January 1957 (aged 63) Minato, Tokyo, Japan
- Spouse: Ayako Tokugawa
- Children: 1
- Parent: Matsudaira Yasutaka
- Education: Kyoto Imperial University

Marquis Yasumasa Matsudaira (松平 康昌, Matsudaira Yasumasa; 12 November 1893 – 4 January 1957) was a Japanese courtier who served as Grand Master of Ceremonies from 1947 to 1957. He was a close aide to Emperor Hirohito.

== Biography ==
Matsudaira was born in 1893 as the son of Marquis Yasutaka Matsudaira, head of the Echizen branch of the Matsudaira clan. His sister Toshiko married Takakimi Mitsui.

In 1905, Matsudaira graduated from Tōkyō Kōtō Shihan Gakkō's attached elementary school (now University of Tsukuba elementary school), going on to graduate from its affiliated junior high school (currently Junior and Senior High School at Otsuka) in 1912. After graduating from Kyoto Imperial University's faculty of law in 1919, he gave lectures at Meiji University and Nihon University. He studied abroad in the United Kingdom and France in 1924. On 15 December 1930, he inherited the family after his father's death. As a marquis, he served in the House of Peers and belonged to the Kayōkai (火曜会). Matsudaira also participated in meetings with kazoku managed by Fumimaro Konoe, Kōichi Kido and Kumao Harada associated with Jūichi-kai (十一会).

On 13 June 1936, Matsudaira was appointed as Kido's chief secretary in the Naidaijin. He retired from that position on 24 November 1945, and on 17 January 1946, he assumed the presidency of the Bureau of Peerage until it was abolished in 1947.

Matsudaira was one of the central aides of Hirohito and the Imperial House of Japan, and after the end of World War II, he contacted the Supreme Commander for the Allied Powers and testified against the International Military Tribunal for the Far East. From March to April 1946, he comprised the Go-jin no kai (五人の会) with Matsudaira Yoshitami, Hidenari Terasaki, Inada Syūichi and Michio Kinoshita, and interviewed the Emperor while writing Shōwa-tennō dokuhaku-roku (昭和天皇独白録, Shōwa-tennō dokuhaku-roku). In 1949, he also drafted The Japanese Emperor and the War, in which he described the Emperor's views of the war in regards to "numerous events of great historical significance."

On 27 March 1947, Matsudaira assumed his position as the Grand Master of Ceremonies. He died while serving in this position on 4 January 1957.

== See also ==
- Joseph B. Keenan

Preceded by Kōichi Kido	Chief Secretary to the Lord Privy Seal; 1936–1945	Position abolished
Preceded by Yoshitami Matsudaira	Chief of the Bureau of Peerage; 1946–1947	Position abolished
Preceded by Morishige Takei	Grand Master of Ceremonies; 1947–1957	Succeeded by Ken Harada
