= Tokudaiji family =

Japanese aristocratic family

Tokudaiji family 徳大寺家
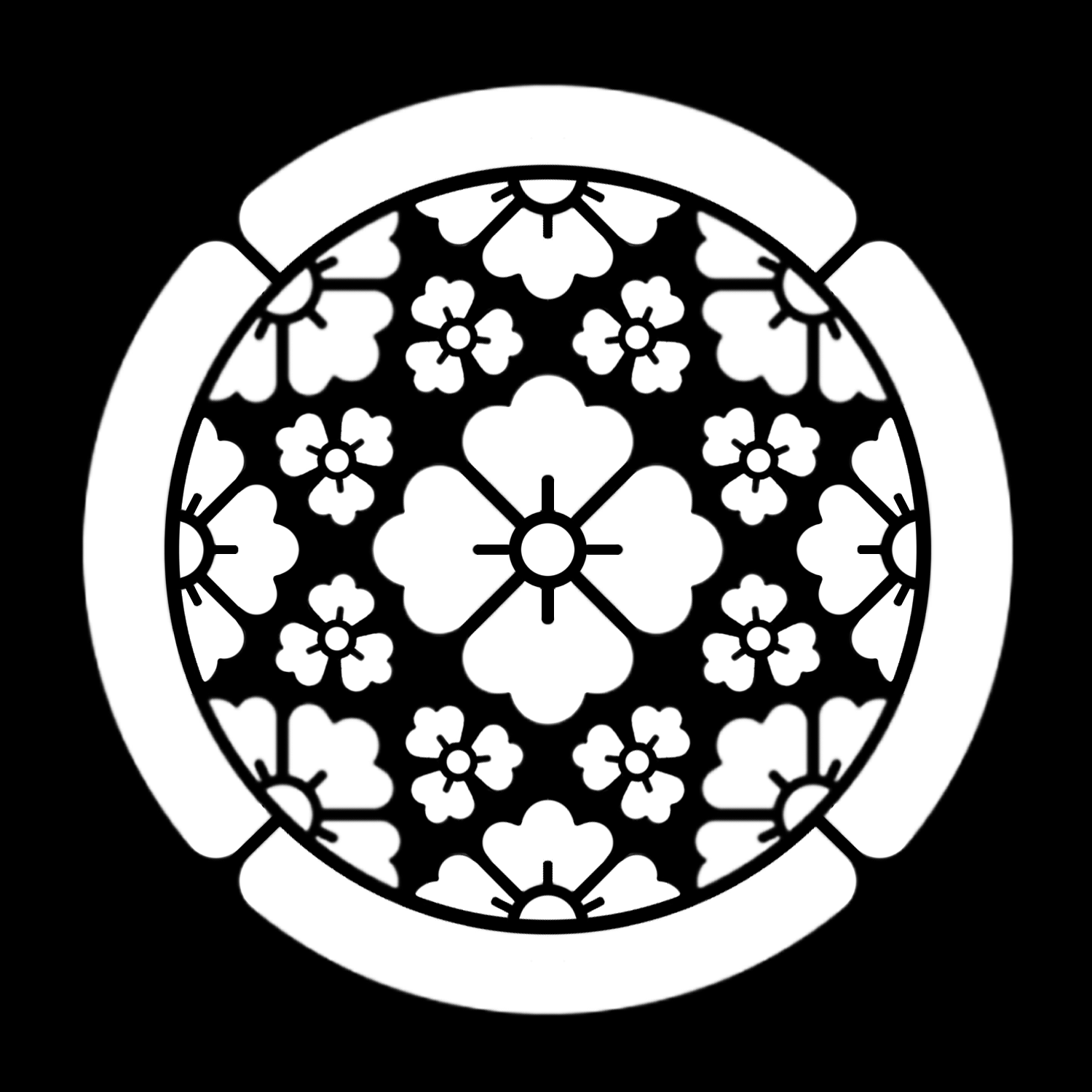
- Mon: Mokkō-karahanafusenryō
- Home province: Yamashiro Province
- Parent house: Fujiwara clan
- Titles: Duke; Marquess
- Founder: Tokudaiji Saneyoshi
- Founding year: 12th century
- Dissolution: still extant
- Ruled until: 1947
- Cadet branches: Tokudaiji family (Baron)

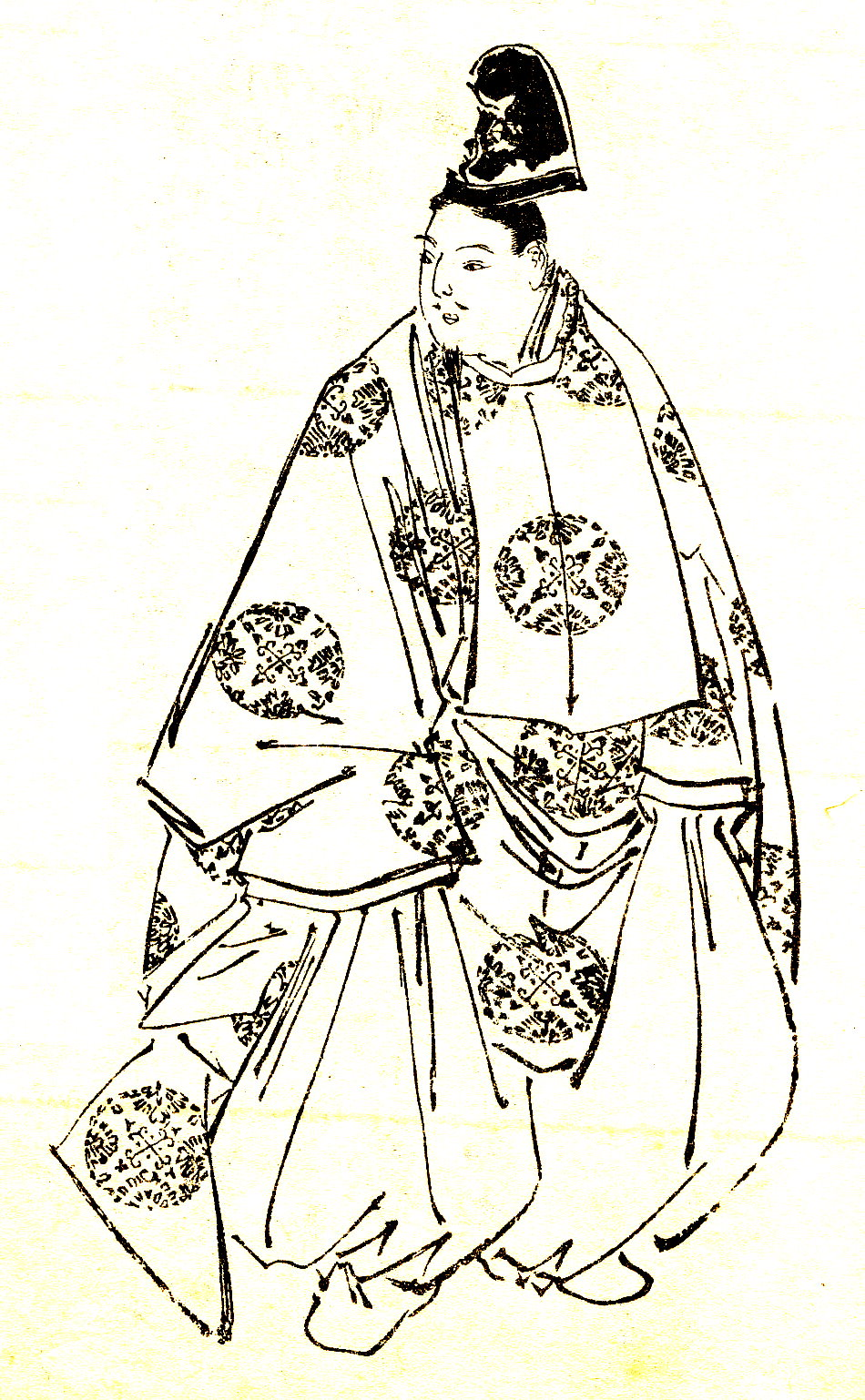
Tokudaiji Sanesada, third head of the Tokudaiji family

The Tokudaiji family (徳大寺家, Tokudaiji-ke) is a Japanese aristocratic family descending from the Fujiwara clan. It is a sister house of the Sanjō family and the Saionji family. Its kuge family rank was seiga, the highest rank. After the Meiji Restoration, the family was appointed Marquess, and later, Duke. The family had a long tradition of playing the bamboo flute.

== Origins ==
The founder of the Tokudaiji family was Minister of the Left Tokudaiji Saneyoshi, the fourth son of Fujiwara no Kinsue. Saneyoshi had a mountain manor in Kinugasaoka, Kadono (currently Kita-ku, Kyoto), and built a Buddhist temple nearby, and called it Tokudaiji. Later, the manor came to be known as Tokudaiji, which Saneyoshi took as his family name.

== History ==
During the Edo period, the Tokudaiji kuge mansion was set up on the north side of Imadegawa Karasuma Higashiiri. The Kyoto Kazoku Kaikan was built on the site in the Meiji era, and after the war, it was acquired by Doshisha University and a library was built on the site. The front gate of the Tokudaiji mansion is the only remaining structure of the mansion.

The Tokudaiji family crest (mon) is one of the Japanese quince crests, the mokkō-karahanafusenryō. Tokudaiji is also known as the first family to use the Japanese quince crest, which has permeated all over Japan to the extent that it is now one of the ten major family crests in Japan.

Adopted children continued the family after bakumatsu. Since then, the head of the Tokudaiji family was the same as the head of Kan'in-no-miya branch of the Imperial Family of Japan.

After the Meiji Restoration, Tokudaiji Sanetsune was appointed Marquess in 1884, and later, Duke in 1911. Furthermore, Tokudaiji Tsunemaro, the third son of Sanetsune, separated from the family and was appointed Baron.

== Family heads ==
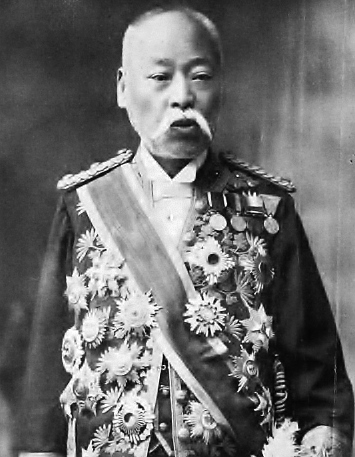
Tokudaiji Sanetsune, second Lord Keeper of the Privy Seal of Japan

1. Tokudaiji Saneyoshi (1096–1157)
2. Tokudaiji Kinyoshi (1115–1161)
3. Tokudaiji Sanesada (1139–1191)
4. Tokudaiji Kintsugu (1175–1227)
5. Tokudaiji Sanemoto (1194–1265)
6. Tokudaiji Kintaka (1253–1305)
7. Tokudaiji Sanetaka (1293–1322)
8. Tokudaiji Kinkiyo (1312–1360)
9. Tokudaiji Sanetoki (1338–1404)
10. Tokudaiji Kintoshi (1371–1428)
11. Tokudaiji Sanemori (1400–1428)
12. Tokudaiji Kinari (1422–1486)
13. Tokudaiji Saneatsu (1445–1533)
14. Tokudaiji Kintane (1487–1526)
15. Tokudaiji Sanemichi (1513–1545)
16. Tokudaiji Kinfusa (1537–1588)
17. Tokudaiji Sanehisa (1583–1616)
18. Tokudaiji Kinnobu (1608–1684)
19. Tokudaiji Sanefusa (1636–1682)
20. Tokudaiji Kinmoto (1678–1719)
21. Tokudaiji Sanenori (1713–1740)
22. Tokudaiji Kinmura (1730–1782)
23. Tokudaiji Sanemi (1754–1819)
24. Tokudaiji Kinnari (1770–1811)
25. Tokudaiji Sanekata (1790–1858)
26. Tokudaiji Kin'ito (1821–1883)
27. Tokudaiji Sanetsune (1839–1919)
28. Tokudaiji Kinsane (1866–1937)
29. Saneatsu Tokudaiji (1889–1970)
30. Kinhide Tokudaiji (1970–?)
31. Sanehiro Tokudaiji (?–present)

== See also ==
- Fujiwara clan
- Tokudaiji Sanesada
- Tokudaiji Sanetsune
