= Yasumasa =

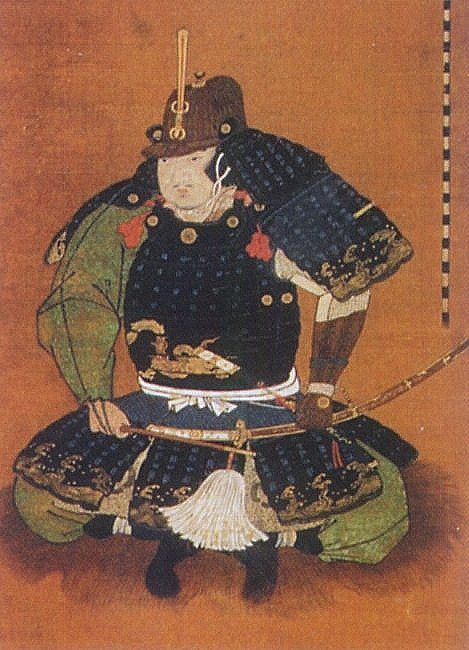
- Yasumasa Sakakibara (1548–1606), Japanese daimyo
- Pronunciation: jasɯmasa (IPA)
- Gender: Male

Origin
- Origin: Japanese
- Meaning: Different meanings depending on the kanji used

Yasumasa is a masculine Japanese given name.

== Written forms ==
Yasumasa can be written using many different combinations of kanji characters. Here are some examples:

- 康正, "healthy, righteous"
- 康雅, "healthy, elegant"
- 康政, "healthy, politics"
- 康昌, "healthy, clear"
- 康将, "healthy, commander"
- 靖正, "peaceful, righteous"
- 靖雅, "peaceful, elegant"
- 靖政, "peaceful, politics"
- 靖昌, "peaceful, clear"
- 靖将, "peaceful, commander"
- 安正, "tranquil, righteous"
- 安政, "tranquil, politics"
- 安昌, "tranquil, clear"
- 保正, "preserve, righteous"
- 保雅, "preserve, elegant"
- 保政, "preserve, politics"
- 泰正, "peaceful, righteous"
- 泰政, "peaceful, politics"
- 泰将, "peaceful, commander"
- 易正, "divination, righteous"
- 易真, "divination, reality"

The name can also be written in hiragana やすまさ or katakana ヤスマサ.

== Notable people with the name ==
- Yasumasa Fukushima (福島 安正; 1852–1919), Japanese general
- Yasumasa Furo (不老 安正; born 1944), Japanese sport shooter
- Yasumasa Hane (羽根 泰正; born 1944), Japanese Go player
- Yasumasa Kanada (金田 康正; 1949–2020), Japanese mathematician
- Yasumasa Kawasaki (川﨑 裕大; born 1992), Japanese footballer
- Yasumasa Matsudaira (松平 康昌; 1893–1957), Japanese bureaucrat
- Yasumasa Morimura (森村 泰昌; born 1951), Japanese artist
- Yasumasa Narasaki (楢崎 泰昌; 1928–2014), Japanese politician
- Yasumasa Nishino (footballer) (西野 泰正; born 1982), Japanese footballer
- Yasumasa Nishino (swimmer) (西野 恭正; 1925–2004), Japanese swimmer
- Yasumasa Sakakibara (榊原 康政; 1548–1606), Japanese daimyō
- Yasumasa Shigeno (重野 安正; born 1941), Japanese politician
- Yasumasa Tanida (谷田 康真; born 1994), Japanese curler

== Fictional characters ==
- Yasumasa Hirai (平井 保昌), a character in the novel Teito Monogatari
