= Ōgane Masujirō =

Japanese government official

- 大金 益次郎
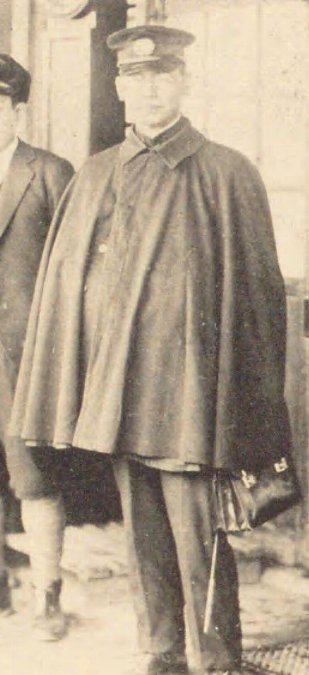

Grand Chamberlain to the Emperor
- In office 3 May 1946 – 5 June 1948
- Monarch: Hirohito
- Preceded by: Hisanori Fujita
- Succeeded by: Mitani Takanobu

Personal details
- Born: 28 October 1894 Tochigi Prefecture, Japan
- Died: 11 March 1979 (aged 84) Meguro, Tokyo, Japan
- Education: Tokyo Imperial University

Ōgane Masujirō (Japanese: 大金益次郎; 28 October 1894 – 11 March 1979) was a Japanese Home Ministry government official. He was born in Tochigi Prefecture. He graduated from Tokyo Imperial University. He was Grand Chamberlain of Japan (1947–1948).

== Bibliography ==
- 戦前期官僚制研究会編 / 秦郁彦著『戦前期日本官僚制の制度・組織・人事』、東京大学出版会、1981年

Preceded by Hisanori Fujita	Grand Chamberlain of Japan; 1947–1948	Succeeded by Mitani Takanobu
