= Kinhide Tokudaiji =

Japanese art critic and aristocrat

- 徳大寺 公英
- Born: 2 November 1919; Tokyo, Japan
- Other names: Kimihide Tokudaiji
- Occupation: Art critic
- Parent(s): Saneatsu Tokudaiji; Yoneko Matsudaira

Kinhide Tokudaiji (徳大寺 公英, Tokudaiji Kinhide; born 2 November 1919), also known as Kimihide Tokudaiji, is a Japanese art critic and aristocrat who was the head of the Tokudaiji family.

== Biography ==
Kinhide Tokudaiji was born on 2 November 1919 in Tokyo as the eldest son of Prince Saneatsu Tokudaiji and Yoneko Tokudaiji. Yoneko was from the Matsudaira family and was the daughter of Count Naoyuki Matsudaira.

Tokudaiji studied political science at the Tokyo Imperial University, graduating in 1945.

Tokudaiji was one of the founding members of Kōbō Abe's Kiroku Geijutsu no Kai. Besides teaching at Gakushuin University, he was also commissioned by the Bridgestone Museum of Art.
