= Higashikuze Michitomi =

Japanese noble and statesman

Count Higashikuze Michitomi
- 東久世 通禧
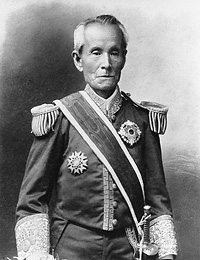
- Higashikuze, in the European-style court dress of a count and wearing his Order of the Rising Sun with Paulownia Flowers

Vice President of the Privy Council
- In office 17 March 1892 – 4 January 1912
- Monarch: Meiji
- President: See list: Itō Hirobumi; Ōki Takatō; Yamagata Aritomo; Kuroda Kiyotaka; Saionji Kinmochi; Itō Hirobumi; Yamagata Aritomo; Itō Hirobumi; Yamagata Aritomo
- Preceded by: Soejima Taneomi
- Succeeded by: Yoshikawa Akimasa

Vice President of the House of Peers
- In office 24 October 1890 – 1 August 1891
- President: Itō Hirobumi; Hachisuka Mochiaki
- Preceded by: Office established
- Succeeded by: Hosokawa Junjirō
Additional positions
Vice Chairman of the Genrōin
In office 22 November 1882 – 1 June 1888
Chairman	Sano Tsunetami; Ōki Takatō
Preceded by	Sano Tsunetami
Succeeded by	Yanagiwara Sakimitsu
Grand Chamberlain to the Emperor
In office 27 November 1871 – 29 August 1877 Serving with Tokudaiji Sanetsune, Masataka Kawase (until 1873)
Monarch	Meiji
Preceded by	Position established
Succeeded by	Yamaguchi Tadasada; Yoneda Torao
Director of the Hokkaidō Development Commission
In office 13 September 1869 – 9 May 1871
Monarch	Meiji
Preceded by	Nabeshima Naomasa
Succeeded by	Kuroda Kiyotaka
Governor of Kanagawa Prefecture
In office 5 April 1868 – 5 November 1868
Monarch	Meiji
Preceded by	Office established
Succeeded by	Terashima Munenori

Member of the Privy Council
- In office 21 July 1891 – 17 March 1892
- Monarch: Meiji
- In office 30 April 1888 – 24 October 1890
- Monarch: Meiji

Member of the House of Peers
- In office October 1890 – 1 August 1891 Nominated by the Emperor

Personal details
- Born: 1 January 1834 Kyoto, Yamashiro, Japan
- Died: 4 January 1912 (aged 78) Tokyo, Japan
- Spouse: Higashikuze Sadako (東久世 貞子)

Count Higashikuze Michitomi (東久世 通禧; 1 January 1834 – 4 January 1912) was a Japanese noble and statesman of the late Edo period and early Meiji period.

He was among the pro-Emperor sonnō jōi faction nobles who escaped to Chōshū Domain after members of the pro-shogunate kōbu gattai faction staged a coup in 1863. After the Meiji Restoration, he was appointed among the first Directors-General of Foreign Affairs (外国事務総督), and served the fledgling government in early negotiations. After this he continued to hold important positions, including Governor of Kanagawa Prefecture, Chairman of the Hokkaidō Development Commission, and Chamberlain, culminating in roles as Vice President of the House of Peers and Vice President of the Privy Council. He was a count in the Japanese peerage. His art names included Chikutei (竹亭).

== Early life ==
Higashikuze was born on 1 January 1834, in Kyoto. His father was Higashikuze Michinaru (東久世 通徳).

He served in the Imperial Court during his youth in the Bakumatsu period, participating in the sonnō jōi movement that advocated the overthrow of the shogunate and restoration of power to the emperor. However, on 30 September 1863, the pro-shōgun kōbu gattai faction took power in the court in a coup d'état. Protected by soldiers of Chōshū Domain, he escaped to Chōshū on a boat with six other court retainers. In 1864, he was moved from Chōshū to Dazaifu.

== Career ==
With the success of the Meiji Restoration in 1868, Higashikuze was rehabilitated. On 17 January of that year he became one of the first Directors-General of Foreign Affairs (外国事務総督), a position later replaced by that of Minister of Foreign Affairs. In this role he presided over the first foreign relations incident of the new government, the Kobe incident, in which a misunderstanding between an Imperial army and two French sailors ballooned into an occupation of central Kobe by foreign troops. On 19 March he was appointed as Director-General of the Yokohama Court, a position which was renamed twice during the half year in which he held it, first to Director-General of the Kanagawa Court and then to Governor of Kanagawa Prefecture.

On 25 August 1869, Higashikuze was appointed as the second Chairman of the Hokkaidō Development Commission. As the previous chairman, Nabeshima Naomasa, had resigned before beginning his work, it was Higashikuze who began the practical operation of the office. On 21 September, he set out for Hokkaido on a ship from Shinagawa, accompanied by about 200 farmers and officials of the Development Commission. He arrived at his post in Hakodate on the 25th. That October, he was granted a fief of 1,000 koku as a reward for his service in the Restoration.

On 15 October 1871, he was appointed Grand Chamberlain to the Emperor. In the same year he joined the Iwakura mission on its trip around the world, broadening his horizons.

In 1882, he served as Vice Chairman of the Genrōin, and with the institution of the Kazoku peerage system in 1884, he was granted the title of count. The hereditary status of the Higashikuze family would ordinarily have placed him as a viscount, but Michitomi's own achievements in the Meiji Restoration led him to be awarded a higher rank. Only a few other exceptions were made in this way, including Sanjō Sanetomi and Iwakura Tomomi.

In 1888 he became a member of the Privy Council, in 1890 the Vice President of the House of Peers, and in 1892 the Vice President of the Privy Council.

== Sources ==
- 平成新修旧華族家系大成 [Collected Genealogies of Former Kazoku Nobles, Heisei New Edition] (in Japanese). Vol. 2. Kasumi Kaikan. 1996. pp. 384–385.
- "Higashikuze Michitomi". 朝日日本歴史人物事典 [Asahi Encyclopedia of Japanese Historical Figures] (in Japanese).
- "Higashikuze Michitomi". 世界大百科事典 第２版 [Heibonsha World Encyclopedia, 2nd Edition] (in Japanese).
- "Higashikuze Michitomi". デジタル版 日本人名大辞典+Plus [Big Dictionary of Japanese Names +Plus, Digital Edition] (in Japanese). Kodansha.
