= Holy See–Japan relations =

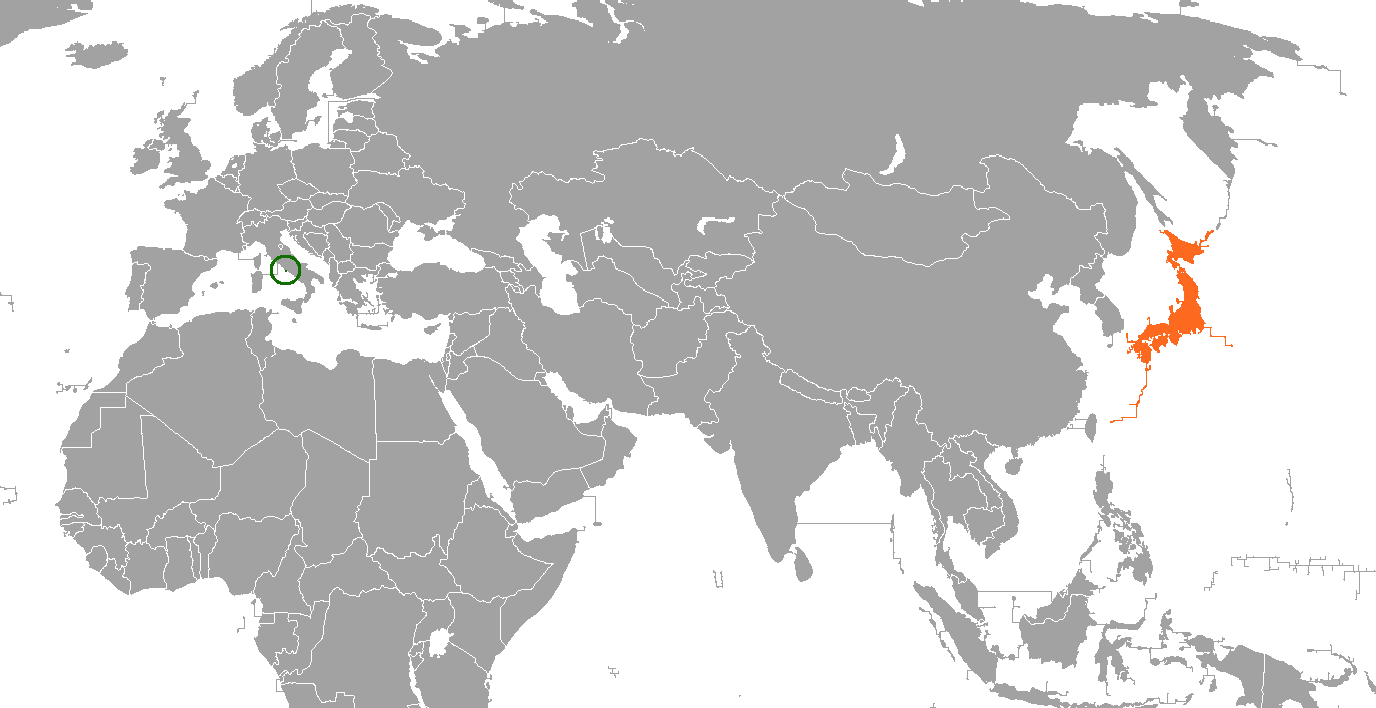
- Holy See: Japan

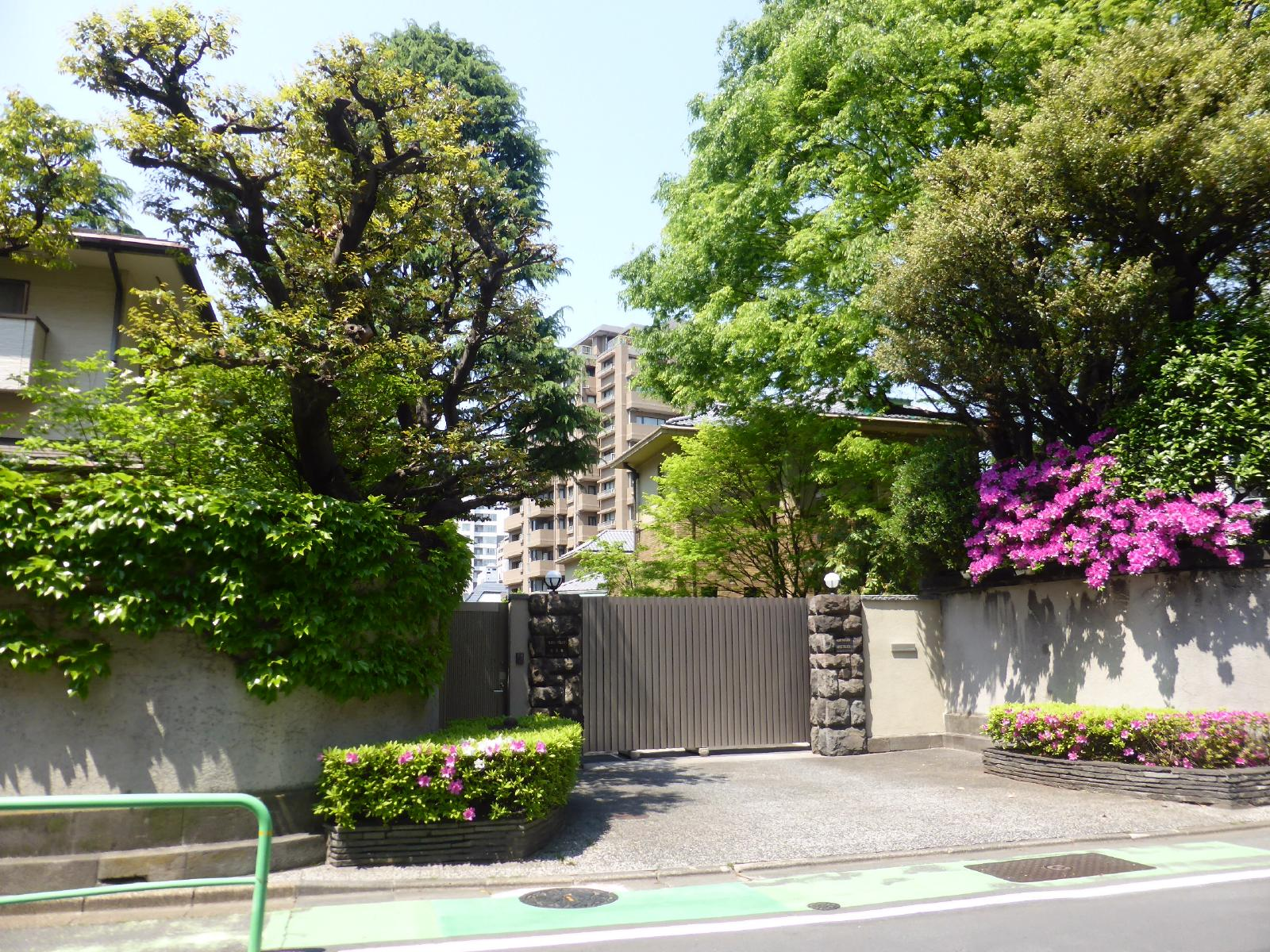
Apostolic Nunciature of the Holy See in Tokyo

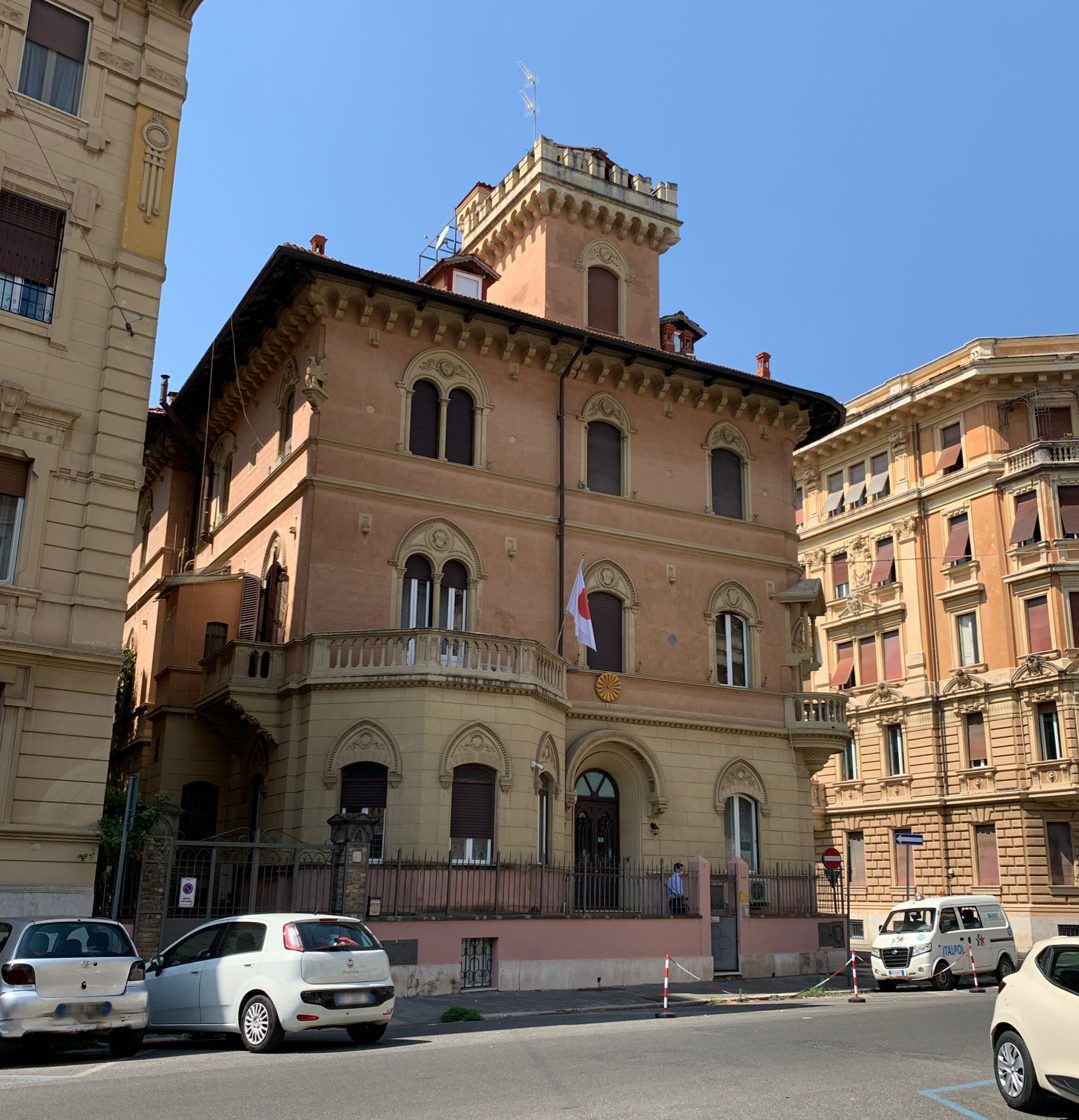
Embassy of Japan to the Holy See in Rome

The relations between the Holy See and Japan were informally established in 1919, when the Japanese government accepted a request by the Holy See to send an apostolic delegate to their country. It was not until 1942 that Japan began full diplomatic relations between the two states, making Japan the first Asian country to do so, and not until 1958 that the Japanese mission to the Vatican in Rome was upgraded to an embassy. The decision was made by Emperor Showa during World War II, hoping that the Vatican could serve as a mediator for negotiations between Japan and the Allies.

Their history goes back further than that, however, dating back to the arrival of Francis Xavier on Kyushu island in 1549 as a missionary. A delegation of four young Japanese envoys traveled with him back to Europe and paid a visit to several European leaders, including Pope Gregory XIII. They were greeted with celebration and brought Japan to the Vatican's attention. The expansion of Christianity in Japan continued for several decades until it was banned in the early 17th century, which remained in place until being lifted by Emperor Meiji in 1873 as part of his reforms. Nonetheless, the number of Catholics in Japan has always remained small, making up less than .5% of the population.

Today, the Holy See and Japan are engaged in close cultural cooperation. The former maintains an apostolic nunciature (diplomatic mission) in Tokyo, while the latter has an embassy accredited to the Vatican in Rome.

== History ==
=== First contacts (1549–1873) ===
Japanese depiction of Francis Xavier, 17th century.

Among the first Christian missionaries in Japan was Francis Xavier, who came there in August 1549 and converted some seven hundred Japanese on the island of Kyushu to Roman Catholicism, including a man known as Bernardo the Japanese, who became the first Japanese person to visit Europe. His mission was a success and by 1580 there were about 100,000 Christians in Japan, including the daimyō (feudal lords) Ōtomo Sōrin and Arima Harunobu.

The Jesuit missionary Alessandro Valignano later visited the country in 1579–82 and convinced Lord Sōrin to send Japanese diplomats to Europe, including to the Pope, on behalf of the converted daimyō. He agreed and selected four Japanese Christian teenage boys, who left from Nagasaki harbor aboard a Portuguese trading vessel on 20 February 1582. This delegation, becoming known as the Tenshō embassy, was Japan's first diplomatic mission in Europe. They finally arrived in Portugal on 11 August 1584, then went on a trip through the continent, meeting various nobles and clergy, including King Philip II of Spain. The young Japanese envoys were greeted throughout European cities with celebration, eventually meeting Pope Gregory XIII upon their arrival in Rome. However, Gregory died in April 1585, not long after their arrival, and they attended the coronation of Pope Sixtus V, who also treated them well.

They left the port of Lisbon, where they had first arrived to Europe, in April 1586, after having spent eight years traveling abroad. Their journey through Europe left a significant impact, bringing the continent's attention to the East Asian country, especially the Vatican's. Likewise, the four Japanese Christians were greeted upon their return in Japan by many interested in learning about Europe, and met with daimyō and imperial regent Toyotomi Hideyoshi in March 1591. They were initially unable to return due to complications regarding the status of Christian missionaries in Japan, staying in Macao for some time.

In 1614 all Christian missionaries were ordered to leave Japan. This led to the beginning of a ban on Christianity in Japan for over two centuries, during which tens of thousands of Japanese Christians were executed.

=== Return of Christianity to Japan (1873–1919) ===
It was not until 1873, during the era of westernization in Japan, that Emperor Meiji lifted the ban on Christianity, giving it religious freedom and allowing missionaries to enter the country. The Vatican recognized the underground activities during the last two centuries and canonized several executed Catholics as martyrs, although much of the missionary work after the lifting of the ban was done by Protestants. Nonetheless, in 1906 Pope Pius X authorized the Society of Jesus to organize establish a Catholic university in Japan, and three Jesuits did so in 1908, getting official approval from the Japanese Ministry of Education in 1913, thus creating the Sophia University as the country's first Catholic university. Discrimination against Christians continued in Japan, with many people viewing it as a "foreign religion", and by 1907 there were only 140,000 Christians in Japan (only 60,000 out of those were Catholic).

The Holy See also began reaching out to the Japanese government during that time. It sent the American bishop William Henry O'Connell to Tokyo in 1905 as a special envoy to thank the Meiji emperor for protection of Catholics from persecution during the Russo–Japanese War. Japan replied by sending its own envoy in 1907. During World War I, the Vatican sent its apostolic delegate to the Philippines, Joseph Petrelli, to deliver a personal greetings from the pontiff to the emperor of Japan.

=== Beginning of diplomatic relations (1919–1958) ===
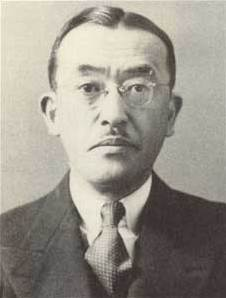
Ken Harada, Japan's first special minister to the Holy See.

In 1919, Pietro Fumasoni Biondi was sent as the apostolic delegate from the Roman Catholic Church to Japan, beginning a new era in relations between that country and the Holy See.

It was not until 1942 that full diplomatic relations between the two states were established, making Japan the first Asian country to have a legation to the Vatican. Emperor Showa established relations because the Vatican had significant moral authority in Western countries, gathered information from all over the world, and he believed that it could serve as mediator between Japan and the Allies. By that point in World War II, Japan had some 20 million Christians living on its territory (the largest group, 13 million, being in the occupied Philippines). This drew criticism against the Holy See from the United States and the United Kingdom, which claimed the move suggested that the Vatican approved of Japan's actions. Despite these protests, the Vatican went ahead and established full relations with Japan, accepting the diplomat Ken Harada, who formerly worked at the Japanese embassy in Vichy France, as the first country's ambassador to the Holy See. Meanwhile, the Vatican's apostolic delegate to Japan Paolo Marella was given full diplomatic status by the Japanese government (although remained only a delegate, to not inflame Buddhists). However, the Vatican did not give in to pressures by Japan and Italy into recognizing the Wang Jingwei Government, Japan's puppet state in occupied China. This was satisfied by an informal agreement with Japan that the pontiff's apostolic delegate in Beijing would visit Catholic missionaries in the Wang Jingwei regime's territory. In 1944 it was reported that Harada gave Pope Pius XII indications that Japan was ready to begin peace negotiations, though later Tokyo radio denied these claims.

In 1958 the Japanese government upgraded the legation to an embassy, also on orders of Emperor Showa, and Pope Pius XII assigned Maximilien de Furstenberg, Vatican City's delegate in Tokyo, as the first Apostolic Nuncio to Japan.

=== Current relations (1958–present) ===
In modern times, Japan and the Holy See have cordial relations and are engaged in cultural cooperation. Despite the small number of Christians in Japan, many Japanese have sympathy for the faith, and according to Ambassador Hidekazu Yamaguchi the Japanese government recognizes "the contribution that the Catholic Church has made to the education and health care of the Japanese people through its schools and hospitals", as well as the humanitarian aid that the Holy See provided in the immediate aftermath of the 2011 Tohoku earthquake and tsunami. He added that Japan and the Vatican share views on many issues.

== High level visits ==
Since the establishment of relations in 1942, several official visits have been made by officials from both countries. In 1993 Emperor Akihito visited the Vatican, Prime Minister Shinzo Abe in 2014, and Prince Akishino in 2016. In November 2019, Pope Francis made an Apostolic Visit to Japan.

== See also ==
- Apostolic Nunciature to Japan
