= Satoru Yamamoto =

Grand Chamberlain of Japan

- 山本 悟

Grand Chamberlain to the Emperor
- In office 13 April 1988 – 12 December 1996
- Monarchs: Hirohito; Akihito
- Preceded by: Yoshihiro Tokugawa
- Succeeded by: Makoto Watanabe

Personal details
- Born: 14 July 1925
- Died: 17 December 2006 (aged 81) Chiyoda, Tokyo, Japan
- Relatives: Kingo Machimura (father-in-law); Nobutaka Machimura (brother-in-law)
- Education: Tokyo First Junior High School; First Higher School
- Alma mater: Tokyo Imperial University

Satoru Yamamoto (山本悟, Yamamoto Satoru; 14 July 1925 – 17 December 2006) was a Japanese official who served as Grand Chamberlain to the Emperor from 1988 to 1996.

Yamamoto graduated from the University of Tokyo in 1948. He later served in the Ministry of Home Affairs. He was appointed Vice Grand Steward in the Imperial Household Agency in 1978. In 1988, he was appointed Grand Chamberlain. He was the last Grand Chamberlain to Emperor Hirohito and the first to Emperor Akihito. He retired due to poor health in 1996 and died in 2006.

His wife was the daughter of the politician Kingo Machimura.

Preceded by Yoshihiro Tokugawa	Grand Chamberlain to the Emperor; 1988–1996	Succeeded by Makoto Watanabe
Preceded by Tomohiko Tomita	Vice Grand Steward of the Imperial Household; 1978–1988	Succeeded by Shōichi Fujimori
