= Yoshihiro Tokugawa =

Japanese politician

- 徳川 義寛

Grand Chamberlain to the Emperor
- In office 1 October 1985 – 13 April 1988
- Monarch: Hirohito
- Preceded by: Sukemasa Irie
- Succeeded by: Satoru Yamamoto

Personal details
- Born: 7 November 1906 Tokyo, Japan
- Died: 2 February 1996 (aged 89)
- Relatives: Owari Tokugawa family
- Education: Tokyo Imperial University; FWU Berlin

Yoshihiro Tokugawa (徳川 義寛, Tokugawa Yoshihiro; 7 November 1906 – 2 February 1996) was a Japanese political figure of the mid to late 20th century. The grandson of Tokugawa Yoshikatsu, the last lord of Owari han, he served as Grand Chamberlain of Japan from 1985 to 1988, serving as the Emperor of Japan's personal adviser. Yoshihiro was famous for saving the recording of Emperor Hirohito's surrender address from destruction by army officials who wished to continue the war during the Kyūjō Incident.

He died in 1996 at the age of 89 due to respiratory failure.
