= Board of Ceremonies =

Department of the Imperial Household Agency of Japan

The Board of Ceremonies (式部職, Shikibu-shoku) is a department of the Imperial Household Agency of Japan. The board is the chief administration charged with ceremonial matters.

== History ==
The history dates back to the Asuka period of the 8th century under the Taihō Code, when the Ministry of Ceremonial Affairs (式部省, Shikibu-shō) was formed. This stayed in existence until the reforms of the Meiji era in 1871, when the ministry was replaced with the Board of Ceremonies (式部局, Shikibu-kyoku), which was soon renamed Bureau of Ceremonies (式部寮, Shikibu-ryō) in 1872. The Ministry of Divinities was abolished, with the bulk of duties moved to the Ministry of Religion (教部省, Kyōbu-shō; "Department (Ministry) of Religion and Education) and the administration of formal ceremonial functions transferred to the Bureau of the Ceremonies. The Bureau of the Ceremonies was initially under the administration of the Great Council of State (太政官, Dajō-kan), but was transferred to the control of the Imperial Household Ministry in September 1877. The Bureau underwent the current name Shikibu-shōku (式部職) change in October 1884.

== Organisation ==
The board is headed by the Grand Master of the Ceremonies (式部官長, Shikibu-kanchō). However, the post has historically gone under the name Shikibu no kami (式部頭).

The Grand Master is assisted by two Vice-Grand Masters of the Ceremonies (式部副長, Shikibu fukuchō). One of them has "purview over ceremonial matters" (儀式総括, gishiki sōkatsu), while the other has "purview over foreign related matters" (外事総括, gaiji sōkatsu).

The first Vice-Grand Master has subordinate "officials of ceremonies" (式官, shikikan) underneath him, variously charged with ceremonial rites, music, and duck netting parties at the duck netting preserves (鴨場, kamoba).

The other Vice-Grand Master is charged foreign matters, i.e., with assisting in coordinating various court functions held for visiting foreign dignitaries. He is also responsible for such activities as the Imperial Family's State visits to foreign countries.

=== Music Department ===
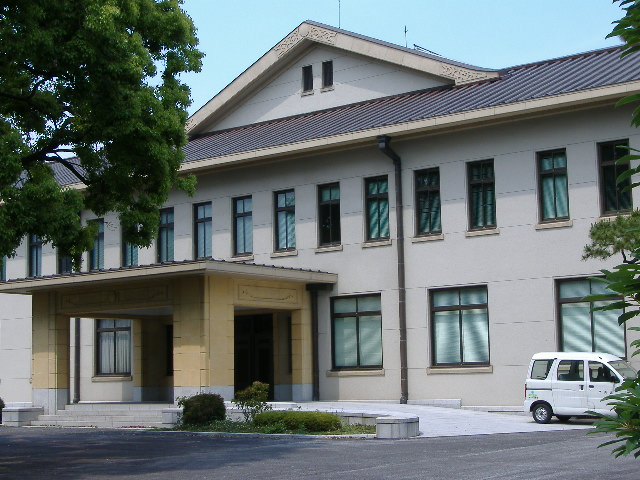
Music Department of the Board of Ceremonies

The board's Music Department (楽部, gakubu) performs both gagaku (雅楽), i.e. ancient court music, and Western classical music.

=== Wild duck preserves ===
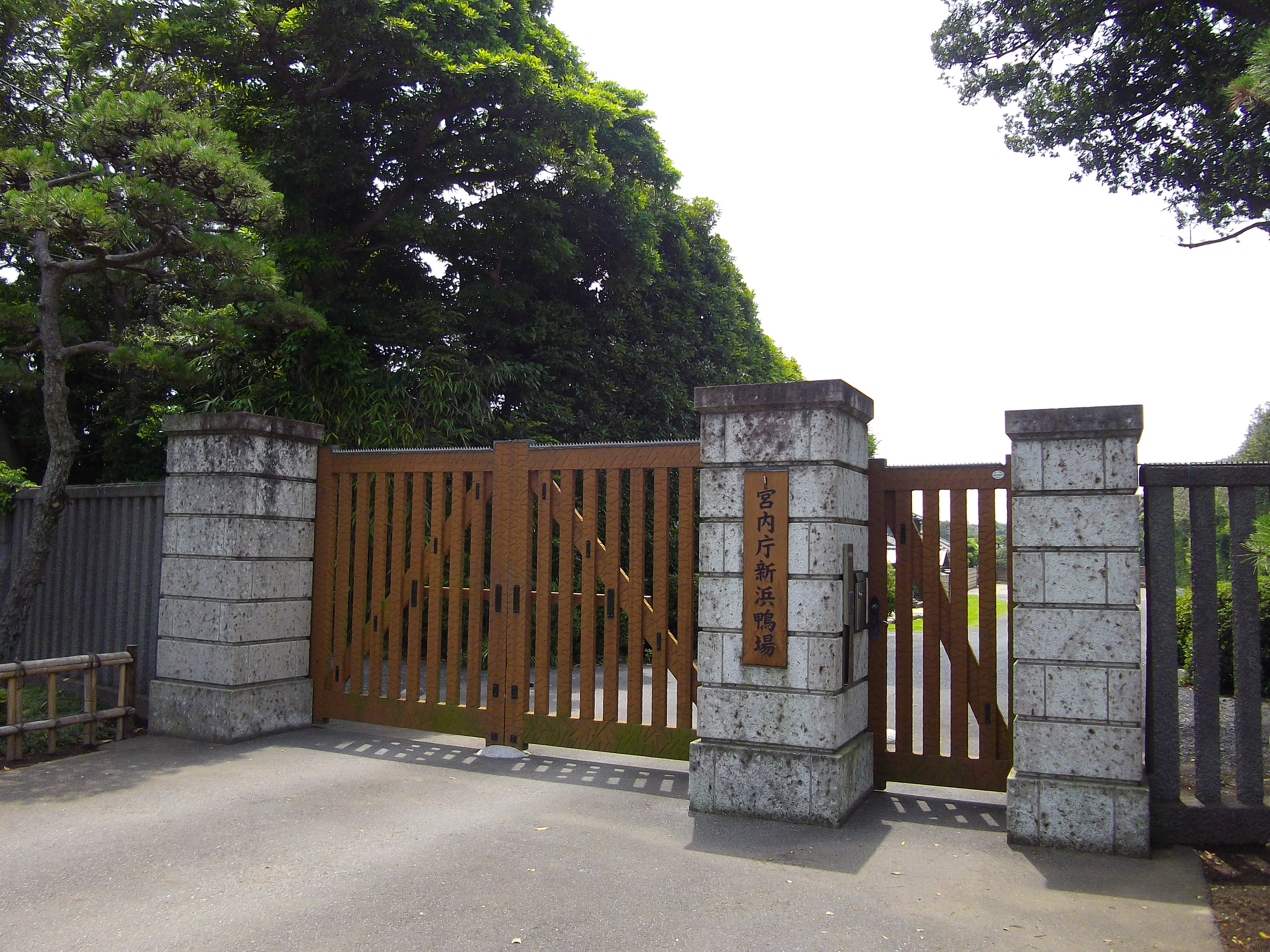
Shinhama Imperial Wild Duck Preserve

The hunting parties at the kamoba preserves invites guests to participate in traditional wild-duck netting, where the wildfowl are tagged. The guests invited to the netting are often diplomatic missions and plenipotentiaries from foreign countries, although cabinet members, members of the National Diet, and Supreme Court Justices are extended invitations also.

== Grand Masters of Ceremonies ==
Below is a historic list of grand masters from 1947:

| Number | Name | Term in Office | Remarks |
Grand Master of Ceremonies (式部頭, Shikibu no kami)
| – | Yasumasa Matsudaira (松平康昌) | Mar 27, 1947 – May 2, 1947 | Granted shinninkan status. (Note: A shinninkan is the highest ranked official, appointed by the emperor, higher in status than chokuninkan appointed by imperial edict/decree.) |
| – | Yasumasa Matsudaira (松平康昌) | May 3, 1947 – May 31, 1949 | |
Grand Masters of Ceremonies (式部官長, Shikibu kanchō)
| 1 | Yasumasa Matsudaira | Jun 1, 1949 – Jan 4, 1957 (died in office) | |
| 2 | Ken Harada (原田健) | Feb 1, 1957 – Sep 10, 1968 (resigned) | |
| 3 | Shigenobu Shima (島重信) | Sep 10, 1968 – Jan 16, 1973 (resigned) | |
| 4 | Morio Yukawa (湯川盛夫) | January 16, 1973 – August 14, 1979 (resigned) | |
| 5 | Isao Abe (安倍勲) | Aug 14, 1979 – Jun 20, 1989 (resigned) | |
| 6 | Kiyoshi Sumiya (角谷清) | Jun 20, 1989 – Sep 8, 1995 (resigned) | |
| 7 | Makoto Watanabe (渡邉允) | Sep 8, 1995 – Dec 12, 1996 | |
| 8 | Yoshio Karita (苅田吉夫) | Dec 12, 1996 – Jul 8, 2003 (resigned) | |
| 9 | Yutaka Kawashima (川島裕) | Jul 8, 2003 – Jun 15, 2007 | |
| 10 | Koichi Haraguchi (原口幸市) | Jun 15, 2007 – Oct 4, 2009 (died in office) | |
| – | (Takashi Koezuka (肥塚隆)) | Oct 8, 2009 – Oct 20, 2009 | Acting GM (Vice-GM) |
| 11 | Takekazu Kawamura (河村武和) | Oct 20, 2009 – Sep 1, 2012 (resigned) | |
| 12 | Nobutake Odano (小田野展丈) | Sep 1, 2012 – Sep 1, 2014 | |
| 13 | Chikao Kawai (河相周夫) | Sep 1, 2014 – May 1, 2015 | |
| 14 | Yoshitaka Akimoto (秋元義孝) | May 1, 2015 – Apr 1, 2023 | |
| 15 | Junichi Ihara (伊原純一) | Apr 1, 2023 – January 16, 2026 | |
| 15 | Masahiro Mikami (三上正裕) | January 16, 2026 – present | |
