= Mitani Takanobu =

Japanese government official and diplomat

- 三谷 隆信
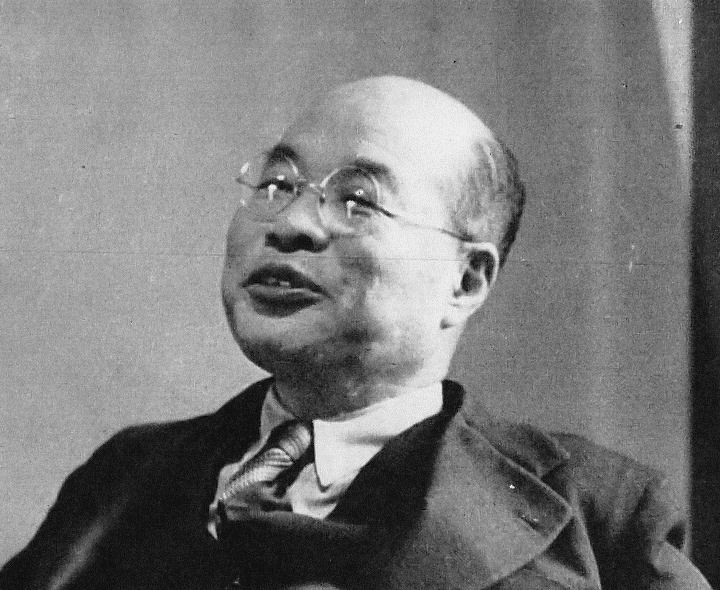
- Takanobu in 1953

Grand Chamberlain to the Emperor
- In office 5 June 1948 – 30 March 1965
- Monarch: Hirohito
- Preceded by: Ōgane Masujirō
- Succeeded by: Inada Syūichi

Japanese Ambassador to France
- In office April 1942 – August 1944
- Preceded by: Sotomatsu Katō
- Succeeded by: Toru Hagiwara (1952)

Japanese Ambassador to Switzerland
- In office 1940–1942
- Preceded by: Masashi Kurihara
- Succeeded by: Taro Tokunaga

Personal details
- Born: 17 June 1892 Iwataki, Kyoto, Japan
- Died: 13 January 1985 (aged 92) Japan
- Resting place: Tama Cemetery
- Relatives: Mitani Takamasa (brother); Hasegawa Shin (half-brother); Keiichiro Asao (grandson)
- Education: Tokyo Imperial University
- Occupation: Diplomat, government official
- Awards: Order of the Sacred Treasure, First Class

Mitani Takanobu (Japanese: 三谷隆信; 17 June 1892 – 13 January 1985) was a Japanese government official who served nearly fifty years in the Foreign Ministry and the Imperial Household Agency, During World War II he was Japan's ambassador to Vichy France, years during which the Japanese armed forces occupied French Indochina while leaving the colonial administration in place. After the war, he served seventeen years as Grand Chamberlain.

Mitani was born in Kanagawa-ku, Yokohama City, Kyoto Prefecture. His father was a raw silk merchant, his mother was a daughter of a wealthy farmer. He graduated from Kyoto Prefectural Fourth Junior High School and First High School, After graduating in Law from Tokyo Imperial University in 1917, he joined the Home Ministry, then in 1920 transferred to the Foreign Ministry.

Mitani served briefly in Paris and attended the Washington Naval Conference before returning to Tokyo for assignments in the Treaty department, and then with personnel. During the 1930s he was First Secretary in the Japanese Embassy in Paris, and thrice served as Chargé d'affaires ad interim between changes of Ambassador. He returned to Tokyo in 1938 to head the Cultural Affairs department. In 1940, he was posted as Minister to Switzerland.

In April 1942, Mitani was named Ambassador to the Pétain government. When the German occupiers withdrew from France during the summer of 1944, he followed the Vichy leadership to Sigmaringen where he spent the next eight months. Amidst the Allied invasion of southern Germany in April 1945. he fled to Switzerland, where he stayed nine months. From Bern on VE Day, Mitani urged his government to sue for peace "on the most favorable terms possible." He saw little hope of success by going through Moscow, and advocated quick overtures to the U.S. and Britain before the Soviet Union decided to enter the Pacific War.

Mitani returned to Japan in early 1946. Resigning from the Foreign Ministry, he was selected as Director of the Women's Department, then Vice Director, of Gakushuin, the 'Peers School' which educated members of the Japanese aristocracy. Crown Prince Akihito attended during those years.

In June 1948 Mitsani was appointed Grand Chamberlain in the royal household. His early years were those of the American occupation, the Korean War and the Peace Treaty conference in San Francisco. He accompanied MacArthur on regional tours, and saw him off on behalf of the Emperor when he was recalled to the United States. Mitani served as Chief Aide to the Crown Prince when he visited the Europe and the U.S. in 1953. He retired in 1965 and was awarded the Order of the Sacred Treasure, First Class.

Himself prominent in Japanese Christian circles, Mitani was a disciple of Uchimura Kanzō and younger brother of the Christian theologist Mitani Takamasa. His appointments to Gakushūin, then as Grand Chamberlain, have been seen as part of Hirohito's consideration in the immediate postwar years of a possible conversion of the royals to Christianity.

His half-brother was Hasegawa Shin, author of "Mother of the Eyelids." A maternal grandson, Keiichiro Asao, is a member of the House of Councillors in the Diet.

Mitani's Memoirs of the Grand Chamberlain was published (in Japanese) in 2024, the latest edition of a volume first printed in 1980.

Preceded by Ōgane Masujirō	Grand Chamberlain of Japan; 1948–1965	Succeeded by Inada Syūichi
