= Sukemasa Irie =

Japanese Essayist

- 入江 相政
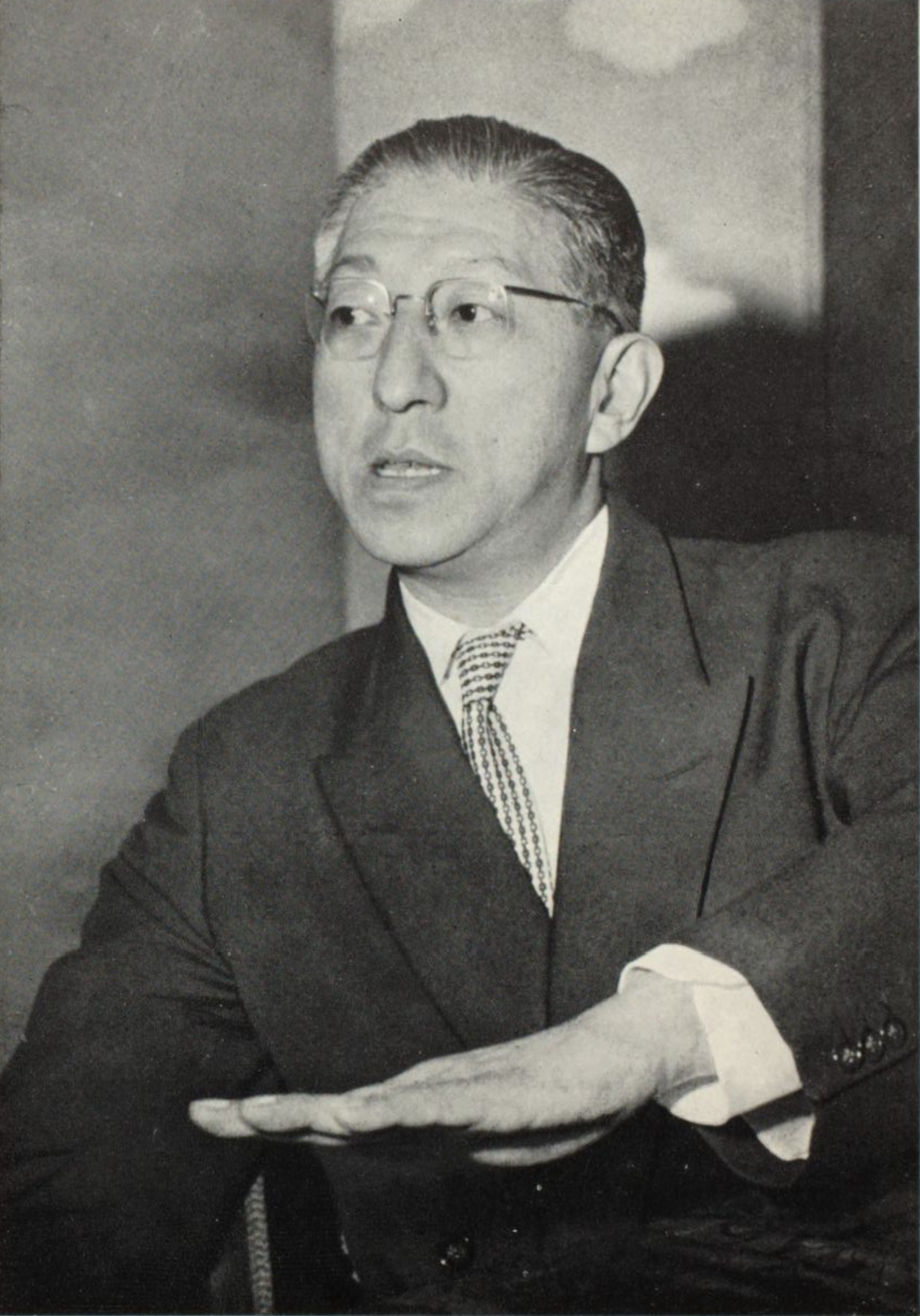
- Irie in 1957

Grand Chamberlain to the Emperor
- In office 16 September 1969 – 29 September 1985
- Monarch: Hirohito
- Preceded by: Inada Syūichi
- Succeeded by: Yoshihiro Tokugawa

Personal details
- Born: 29 June 1905 Minato, Tokyo, Japan
- Died: 29 September 1985 (aged 80) Shinjuku, Tokyo, Japan
- Spouse: Kimiko Iwasaki (m. 1931; died 1983)
- Education: Tokyo Imperial University

Sukemasa Irie (入江 相政, Irie Sukemasa; 29 June 1905 – 29 September 1985) was a Japanese essayist.

== Life ==
A second cousin of the Shōwa Emperor, Irie was born in Tokyo. He was a graduate of Tokyo Imperial University. He was Grand Chamberlain of Japan (1969–1985). He was a recipient of the Order of the Rising Sun and the Order of the Sacred Treasure.

== Ancestry ==
Ancestors of Sukemasa Irie

16. Reizei Tamenori (1777-1848)
8. Reizei Tametake (1802-1845)
17. Seikanji Kaneko (d. 1865)
4. Reizei Tametada (1824-1885)
2. Viscount Irie Tamemori (1868-1936)
1. Sukemasa Irie
24. Yanagihara Takamitsu (1793-1851)
12. Yanagihara Mitsunaru (1818-1885)
25. Ōgimachisanjō Noriko (1797-1859)
6. Count Yanagihara Sakimitsu (1850-1894)
26. Hasegawa Yukiaki
13. Hasegawa Utano (1832-1891)
3. Hon. Yanagihara Nobuko (1876-1953)
28. Yamaguchi Naokatsu (1777-1825)
14. Date Munenari (1818-1892)
7. Date Hatsuko (1854-1936)
15. Takeda

== Bibliography ==
- 『入江相政日記』（朝日新聞社全6巻、1990年 - 1991年、朝日文庫全12巻、1994年 - 1995年）

Preceded by Inada Syūichi	Grand Chamberlain of Japan; 1969–1985	Succeeded by Yoshihiro Tokugawa
