= Makoto Watanabe (diplomat) =

Japanese diplomat (1936–2022)

- 渡辺 允

Grand Chamberlain to the Emperor
- In office 12 December 1996 – 15 June 2007
- Monarch: Akihito
- Preceded by: Satoru Yamamoto
- Succeeded by: Yutaka Kawashima

Japanese Ambassador to Jordan
- In office 1988–1990
- Preceded by: Kira Nakayama
- Succeeded by: Tadashi Nonoyama

Personal details
- Born: 9 May 1936 Tokyo, Japan
- Died: 8 February 2022 (aged 85) Shinjuku, Tokyo, Japan
- Parent: Akira Watanabe (father)
- Education: University of Tokyo

Makoto Watanabe (渡辺 允, Watanabe Makoto; 9 May 1936 – 8 February 2022) was a Japanese diplomat and courtier who was Grand Chamberlain to the Emperor from 1996 to 2007.

== Biography ==
Watanabe was born in Tokyo, to an aristocratic family with connections to the Imperial House. His father Count Akira Watanabe, was a schoolmate of Emperor Hirohito, and his great-grandfather Count Chiaki Watanabe, was imperial household minister to Emperor Meiji. Watanabe attended Gakushuin and Hibiya High School. After studying for the Faculty of Law at the University of Tokyo, he graduated and joined the Ministry of Foreign Affairs in 1959.

As a foreign service trainee, he attended Swarthmore College in the United States. He was Ambassador to Jordan from 1988 to 1990. He was also director of the Middle East and Africa Bureau and chief of protocol at the ministry. In 1995, he entered the Imperial Household as grand master of ceremonies. In 1996 he was appointed Grand Chamberlain to the Emperor.

On the 60th anniversary of the end of the Pacific War in 2005, Watanabe played an important role in realizing the Emperor and Empress's visit to Saipan to commemorate war dead. In reaction to the book Princess Masako: Prisoner of the Chrysanthemum Throne, Watanabe issues a letter of protest in 2007, disputing disparaging remarks about the Imperial Family's public activities..

Watanabe retired in 2007. The following year he was awarded the Grand Cordon of the Order of the Sacred Treasure. He was an adviser to the Imperial Household Agency from April 2012 to June 2020. Watanabe died due to aspiration pneumonia on 8 February 2022, at the age of 85.

Preceded by Satoru Yamamoto	Grand Chamberlain to the Emperor; 1996–2007	Succeeded by Yutaka Kawashima
Preceded by Kiyoshi Sumiya	Grand Master of Ceremonies; 1995–1996	Succeeded by Yoshio Karita
