= Yoshiko Ohtani =

Japanese religious leader

- Born: Yoshiko Tokkudaiji; 1918
- Died: 2000 (aged 81–82)
- Other names: Yoshiko Otani
- Occupation: Religious organization leader
- Father: Saneatsu Tokudaiji

Yoshiko Ohtani (1918 – 2000), born Yoshiko Tokudaiji, often referred to as Lady Ohtani, was a Japanese religious organization leader. She was world federation president of the Buddhist Women's Association from 1959 to 1982.

== Early life and education ==
Tokudaiji was the daughter of a nobleman, Saneatsu Tokudaiji, and his wife, Yoneko Matsudaira. She attended Gakushuin Women's College.

== Career ==
As the wife of Kosho Ohtani, a Shin Buddhist leader known as the 23rd Monshu, she was considered urakata, a spiritual leader for Japanese Buddhist women. She traveled with her husband to visit Japanese communities, schools, and hospitals in the United States and Canada in the 1950s, 1960s, and 1970s. She started all-Japan and world conferences for chapters of the Buddhist Wonen's Association (BWA) or Fujinkai. In 1974, she and her husband attended the 75th anniversary festivities of the Buddhist Churches in America denomination, held in San Francisco. She was succeeded as urakata and as the BWA's honorary president by her daughter-in-law, Noriko Ohtani, after the BWA's 7th world conference in 1982.

She was also president of the Jodo Shinshu Nursery School Federation, and honorary president of several women's colleges and schools. She wrote poetry, and a biography of Eshinni, wife of the founder of Shin Buddhism.

== Publications ==
- Eshin Ni; the Wife of Shinran Shonin (1970)

== Personal life ==
Tokudaiji was married to Kosho Ohtani in 1937. He was the first cousin of Emperor Hirohito. Their wedding was reported in Western press including Time magazine and The New York Times. They lived on the grounds of Nishi Hongan-ji in Kyoto and had four children. Their son Koshin Ohtani succeeded his father as the sect's leader, or Gomonshu. She died in 2000, at the age of 82.
