= Shōichi Saba =

Japanese businessman (1919–2012)

Shōichi Saba KBE

Chief Scout of the Scout Association of Japan
- In office 1974–2003
- Preceded by: Akira Watanabe
- Succeeded by: Tsunao Hashimoto

Shōichi Saba (佐波正一, Saba Shōichi) (KBE; February 28, 1919 in Tokyo – September 10, 2012) was one of the pioneers of postwar Japanese manufacturing. He served as the Chairman of the Board and Chief Scout of the Scout Association of Japan, serving for 12 years from 1994, and was the former Chair of the Board of Trustees of the International Christian University.

== Background ==
Intrigued at the workings of the household radio during his childhood, Saba chose to study electrical engineering. He received a bachelor's degree in electrical engineering from the University of Tokyo in December 1941 and went to work for the Toshiba Corporation (before he was called to active service in the Imperial Japanese Army on February 1, 1942), where he later became President and CEO. In 1956 and 1957, he served as a representative of Toshiba to General Electric in Schenectady, New York. He was conferred by ICU with an honorary doctor of letters in 2009.

Saba served as Chairman of the Japan Machinery Foundation (today, the Japan Electronics and Information Technology Industries Association); Vice Chairman for the Japan Federation of Economic Organizations; Chairman of the Japan Machinery Federation; and Counselor to the Bank of Japan. He was named a member of the Royal Swedish Academy of Engineering Sciences; fellow of the Royal Society of Arts; and foreign associate to the National Academy of Engineering.

During his tenure as president of Toshiba from 1980 to July 1987, he helped bring portable computers to the consumer market. Saba funneled vast resources into research and development, especially in the areas of semiconductors, computers, and telecommunications. In the Toshiba-Kongsberg scandal, Saba and President Sugiichiro Watari resigned from their official posts, though he remained as adviser to the board rather than having to sever a 45-year tie. Well into his 80s he was seen almost daily in the office. Saba was also the first Japanese director of Imperial Chemical Industries as a non-executive in 1985.

Saba was awarded the Medal with Blue Ribbon (藍綬褒章, ranjuhōshō) in 1980; First Class of the Order of the Sacred Treasure in 1990; the Commander's Cross (Großes Verdienstkreuz) of the Order of Merit of the Federal Republic of Germany; and the Honorary Knight Commander of the Order of the British Empire in 1990. In 1999 he also received the highest distinction of the Scout Association of Japan, the Golden Pheasant Award.

Saba's fundraising efforts supported the centenary Japan Festival event of the Japan Society of the UK, including the first sumo tournament held outside Japan.

Preceded by Akira Watanabe	Chief Scout of the Scout Association of Japan; 1974–2003	Succeeded by Tsunao Hashimoto
