= Akira Watanabe (Scouting) =

Japanese politician

Count Akira Watanabe
- 渡辺 昭
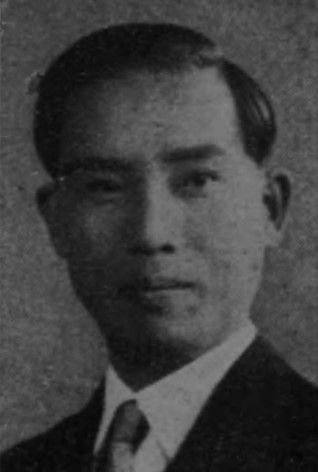
- Watanabe in 1943

Chief Scout of the Scout Association of Japan
- In office 1974–2003
- Preceded by: Saburō Matsukata
- Succeeded by: Shōichi Saba

Member of the House of Peers
- In office 24 June 1943 – 13 April 1946 Elected by the Counts

Personal details
- Born: 25 December 1901 Takanawa, Tokyo, Japan
- Died: 23 July 2005 (aged 103) Tokyo, Japan
- Children: Makoto Watanabe

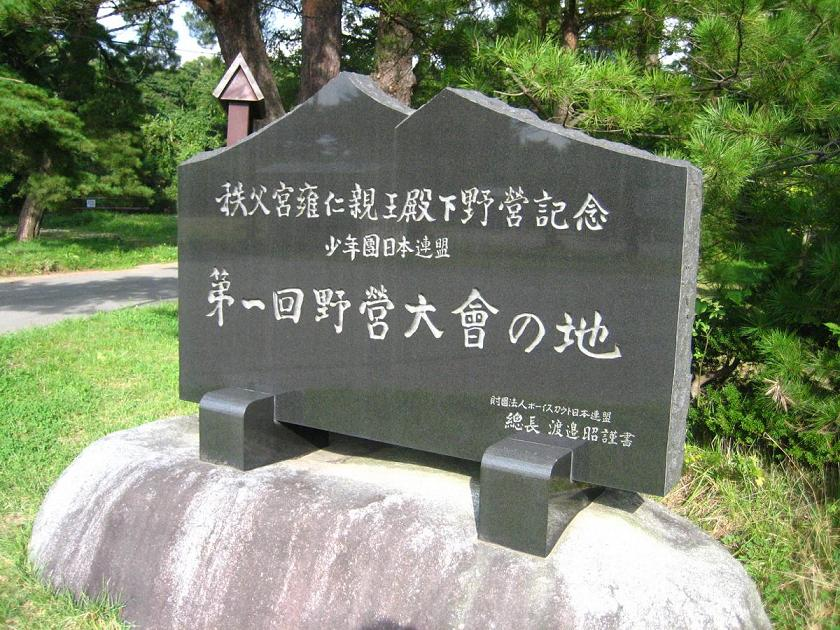
Commemorative plaque dedicated by Akira Watanabe, stating that Tenjinhama is the site of the first Boy Scouts of Japan camping trip attended by the Imperial Family

Akira Watanabe (渡辺昭; 25 December 1901 – 23 July 2005) was the seventh National President of the Boy Scouts of Japan from 1974 to 2003, and served on the World Scout Committee of the World Organization of the Scout Movement.

== Background ==
A count/earl as a member of a Kazoku, he sat in the House of Peers and was known as the "last school friend of the Showa Emperor".

In 1977, Watanabe was awarded the 124th Bronze Wolf, awarded by the World Scout Committee for exceptional services to world Scouting, at the 26th World Scout Conference. In 1979 he also received the highest distinction of the Scout Association of Japan, the Golden Pheasant Award.

| Preceded by Saburō Matsukata | Chief Scout of the Scout Association of Japan; 1974–2003 | Succeeded by Shōichi Saba |
