= Tokudaiji Sanetsune =

Japanese politician (1840–1919)

Prince Tokudaiji Sanetsune
- 徳大寺 実則
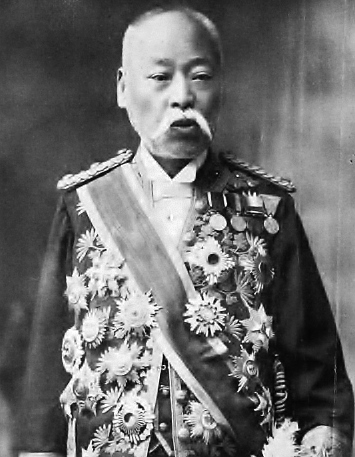
- Duke Sanetsune Tokudaiji, c. 1913

Lord Keeper of the Privy Seal
- In office 21 February 1891 – 12 August 1912
- Monarchs: Meiji; Taishō
- Preceded by: Sanjō Sanetomi
- Succeeded by: Katsura Tarō

Grand Chamberlain to the Emperor
- In office 21 March 1884 – 13 August 1912
- Monarchs: Meiji; Taishō
- Preceded by: Yamaguchi Tadasada; Yoneda Torao
- Succeeded by: Katsura Tarō
- In office 18 September 1871 – 29 August 1877 Serving with Masataka Kawase (until 1873), Higashikuze Michitomi
- Monarch: Meiji
- Preceded by: Position established
- Succeeded by: Yamaguchi Tadasada; Yoneda Torao

Member of the House of Peers
- In office February 1890 – 4 June 1919 Hereditary peerage

Personal details
- Born: 10 January 1840 Kyoto, Yamashiro, Japan
- Died: 4 June 1919 (aged 79) Sendagaya, Tokyo, Japan
- Children: Takachiho Nobumaro
- Parent: Tokudaiji Kin'ito (father)
- Relatives: Tokudaiji family

Prince Sanetsune Tokudaiji (徳大寺 実則; 10 January 1840 – 4 June 1919) was a Japanese courtier who served as Lord Keeper of the Privy Seal of Japan from 1891 to 1912 during the Meiji era.

== Life ==
Tokudaiji Sanetsune was born to a branch of the Fujiwara court nobility in Kyoto. His father was Tokudaiji Kin'ito, and his brother was Saionji Kinmochi, later Prime Minister of Japan.

Joining the sonnō jōi ("Revere the Emperor, Expel the Barbarian") faction in Court against westernization and the Tokugawa shogunate, he was forced to flee Kyoto during the coup d'état by the moderate samurai of the Aizu and Satsuma domains on 18 August 1863. He returned after the Meiji Restoration and served in a number of posts in the new government. He became a Dainagon in 1869.

In 1884, he was given the title of koshaku (marquis) under the new kazoku nobility rankings, and was subsequently elevated to koshaku (prince). In 1891 he became Lord Keeper of the Privy Seal of Japan a post he held until Emperor Meiji's death. He felt very strongly that the Emperor should not involve himself in politics or in the decision-making process of government.

== Honours ==
- Grand Cordon of the Order of the Rising Sun (22 November 1877)
- Marquess (7 July 1884)
- Grand Cordon of the Order of the Rising Sun with Paulownia Flowers (7 October 1895)
- Grand Cordon of the Order of the Chrysanthemum (1 April 1906)
- Prince (21 April 1911)
- Collar of the Order of the Chrysanthemum (4 June 1919; posthumous)

=== Order of precedence ===
- Fifth rank, junior grade (12th day of the seventh month of the first year of Kaei (1848))
- Fifth rank, senior grade (Fifth day of the first month of the second year of Kaei (1849))
- Senior fifth rank, junior grade (Third day of the second month of the third year of Kaei (1850))
- Fourth rank, junior grade (28th day of the seventh month of the fourth year of Kaei (1851))
- Fourth rank, senior grade (27th day of the first month of the fifth year of Kaei (1852))
- Senior fourth rank, junior grade (Eighth day of the fifth month of the sixth year of Kaei (1853))
- Third rank (19th day of the 12th month of the fourth year of Ansei (1857))
- Senior third rank (24th day of the third month of the fifth year of Ansei (1858))
- Second rank (24th day of the 12th month of the second year of Bunkyu (1862))
- Senior second rank (28th day of the second month of the third year of Keio (1867))
- First rank (December of the 32nd year of Meiji, or 1899)
