= Yoneda Torao =

- 米田 虎雄
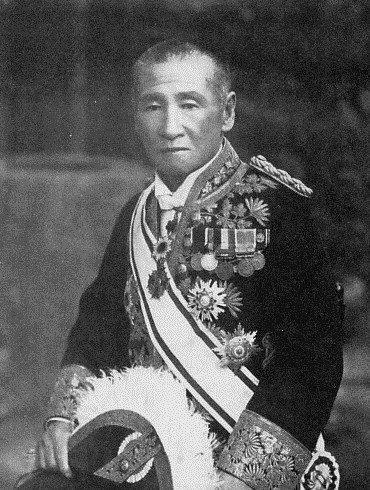

Grand Chamberlain to the Emperor
- In office 24 December 1878 – 22 March 1884 Serving with Yamaguchi Tadasada
- Monarch: Meiji
- Preceded by: Tokudaiji Sanetsune; Masataka Kawase (1873); Higashikuze Michitomi
- Succeeded by: Tokudaiji Sanetsune

Personal details
- Born: 10 March 1839 Kumamoto, Higo, Japan
- Died: 27 November 1915 (aged 76)
- Resting place: Tōkai-ji
- Awards: Order of the Rising Sun; Order of the Sacred Treasure

Military service
- Allegiance: Empire of Japan
- Branch/service: Imperial Japanese Army
- Battles/wars: Boshin War

Yoneda Torao (米田 虎雄; 10 March 1839 – 27 November 1915) was an Imperial Japanese Army veteran of the Boshin War. He was born in Kumamoto Prefecture. He was Grand Chamberlain of Japan (1878-1884). He was recipient of the Order of the Rising Sun (2nd class, 1895; 1st class, 1915) and the Order of the Sacred Treasure (3rd class, 1888; 1st class, 1908).

== Bibliography ==
- Office of Historiography, ed. "百官履歴 下巻" (Curricula Vitae of All Government Officials – Volume 1), Nihon Shiseki Kyokai, 1928.
- Inamura, Tetsugen and others, "大正過去帳 - 物故人名辞典" (Taisho Death Records – Biographical Dictionary of Deceased Individuals), Tokyo Bijutsu, 1973.
- Historical Society of Japan, ed. "明治維新人名辞典" (Biographical Dictionary of the Meiji Restoration), Yoshikawa Kobunkan, 1981.
- Asahi Shimbun, "朝日日本歴史人物事典" (Asahi Encyclopedia of Japanese Historical Figures), Asahi Shinbunsha 1994.
- Kasumi Kaikan Editorial Committee for a Complete Compilation of Genealogies of Peers, 平成新修旧華族家系大成 上巻 (Complete Compilation of the Genealogies of Former Peers: New Heisei Edition – Volume 1), Kasumi Kaikan, 1996.
- Hata, Ikuhiko, ed. "日本官僚制総合事典: 1868 – 2000" (Comprehensive Encyclopedia of the Japanese Bureaucracy: 1868 - 2000), Tokyo Daigaku Shuppankai, 2001.
- Yasuoka, Akio, ed. "幕末維新大人名事典 上巻" (Great Biographical Dictionary of the late-Edo and Meiji Periods – Volume 1), Shin Jinbutsu Oraisha, 2010.

Preceded by Yamaguchi Tadasada	Grand Chamberlain of Japan; 1878–1884	Succeeded by Tokudaiji Sanetsune
