= Yamaguchi Tadasada =

Japanese politician and veteran

- 山口 正定

Grand Chamberlain to the Emperor
- In office 24 December 1878 – 22 March 1884 Serving with Yoneda Torao
- Monarch: Meiji
- Preceded by: Tokudaiji Sanetsune; Masataka Kawase (1873); Higashikuze Michitomi
- Succeeded by: Tokudaiji Sanetsune

Governor of Ibaraki Prefecture
- In office 9 December 1871 – 20 July 1872
- Monarch: Meiji
- Preceded by: Yamaoka Tesshū
- Succeeded by: Nomura Motosuke

Personal details
- Born: 18 October 1843
- Died: 21 March 1902 (aged 58)

Yamaguchi Tadasada (Japanese: 山口 正定; 18 October 1843 – 21 March 1902) was an Imperial Japanese Navy veteran of the Boshin War and Meiji-era Japanese politician. He was the second governor of Ibaraki Prefecture (1872). He was Grand Chamberlain of Japan (1878–1884). He was a recipient of the Order of the Sacred Treasure (3rd class, 1888; 1st class, 1902) and the Order of the Rising Sun (2nd class, 1895).

Preceded by Yamaoka Tesshū	Governor of Ibaraki Prefecture; 1872	Succeeded by Nomura Motosuke
Preceded by Higashikuze Michitomi	Grand Chamberlain of Japan; 1878–1884	Succeeded by Yoneda Torao

== Bibliography ==
- 歴代知事編纂会編『新編日本の歴代知事』歴代知事編纂会、1991年。
- 秦郁彦編『日本官僚制総合事典：1868 - 2000』東京大学出版会、2001年。
- 『朝日日本歴史人物事典』朝日新聞社、1994年。
- 日本歴史学会編『明治維新人名辞典』吉川弘文館、1981年。
- 大植四郎編『明治過去帳』新訂初版、東京美術、1971年（原著私家版1935年）。
- 内閣「主猟局長兼宮中顧問宮主殿頭正三位勲二等男爵山口正定勲位進級ノ件」明治35年。国立公文書館 請求番号：本館-2A-017-00・勲00095100
