= Hisanori Fujita =

Japanese admiral (1880–1970)

- 藤田 尚徳
- Born: 30 October 1880; Aichi Prefecture, Japan
- Died: 23 July 1970 (aged 89); Anjō, Aichi, Japan
- Military career
- Allegiance: Empire of Japan
- Branch: Imperial Japanese Navy
- Service years: 1901–1939
- Rank: Admiral
- Commands: Suma, Kirishima, Naval Personnel Bureau, 3rd Squadron, Naval Construction Bureau, Kure Naval District, Naval Councillor
- Conflicts: World War I World War II
- Other work: Vice-Minister of the Navy; Chief Priest of Meiji Shrine

Grand Chamberlain to the Emperor
- In office 29 August 1944 – 3 May 1946
- Monarch: Hirohito
- Preceded by: Saburō Hyakutake
- Succeeded by: Ōgane Masujirō

Hisanori Fujita (藤田 尚徳, Fujita Hisanori; 30 October 1880 – 23 July 1970) was a Japanese admiral in the Imperial Japanese Navy, court official and Shinto priest. After retiring from active service, he served as Chief Priest of Meiji Shrine and the Grand Chamberlain to Emperor Hirohito during World War II.

== Biography ==
Fujita was born in Aichi Prefecture, where his father, a former samurai from Tsugaru Domain, served as a school principal. He attended the 29th class of the Imperial Japanese Naval Academy in 1901, graduating 15th of 115 cadets. One of his classmates was the future Prime Minister of Japan Mitsumasa Yonai.

Fujita graduated from the Naval Staff College in 1908, and in December 1911 was assigned to serve on the battleship Shikishima.

In February 1915, during World War I, Fujita was sent as a naval attaché to England, and was promoted to commander while still assigned to the Japanese embassy in London in 1916. After his return to Japan in October 1917, he became executive officer on the battleship Settsu for a one-month period in December 1917. Subsequently he held a number of shore assignments to the end of 1920.

Fujita attained the rank of captain in December 1920, and received his first command, that of the protected cruiser Suma. After a number of shore assignments from 1921 to 1924, he was appointed captain of the battleship Kirishima on 1 December 1924.

He was promoted to rear admiral in December 1925 and became Director of the Personnel Department of the Navy Ministry in December 1926. In November 1929, he attained the rank of vice admiral, and took command of the Yokosuka Naval Arsenal. In June 1930, he was Director of Naval Shipbuilding Command. Fujita became Navy Vice-Minister in June 1932, and Commander in Chief of Kure Naval District in May 1934. In April 1936, he was made a full admiral. He became a naval councilor in December 1936.

Fujita was considered for the post of Minister of the Navy in 1939, but after deliberation and consultation with Admiral Sankichi Takahashi, he stepped aside in favor of Mitsumasa Yonai and went into the reserves in April 1939. After his retirement, Fujita served as Chief Priest of Meiji Shrine until the end of August 1944. He was then appointed Grand Chamberlain to emperor Hirohito from 29 August 1944 to 3 May 1946, accompanying the emperor to his meetings with the head of the American occupation forces, General Douglas MacArthur. However, due to Fujita’s military background, MacArthur ordered his dismissal in 1946.

Fujita died in Anjō, Aichi on 23 July 1970.

== Naval career ==
From the corresponding article in the Japanese Wikipedia

- Graduated as a Midshipman (14 December 1901)
- Ensign (23 January 1903)
- Sub-Lieutenant (13 July 1904)
- Lieutenant (5 August 1905)
- Lieutenant-Commander (1 December 1911)
- Commander (1 December 1916)
- Captain (1 December 1920)
- Rear-Admiral (1 December 1925)
- Vice-Admiral (30 November 1929)
- Admiral (1 April 1936)
- Retired and went into the reserves (5 April 1939)

Preceded by Sakonji Seizō	Vice-Minister of the Navy; 1 June 1932 - 10 May 1934	Succeeded by Hasegawa Kiyoshi
Preceded by Nakamura Ryōzō	Commander of the Kure Naval District; 10 May 1934 – 1 December 1936	Succeeded by Katō Takayoshi
Preceded by Saburō Hyakutake	Grand Chamberlain to the Emperor; August 1944 – May 1946	Succeeded by Ōgane Masujirō
