= Tenjin Beach =

Beach in Japan

- Beach
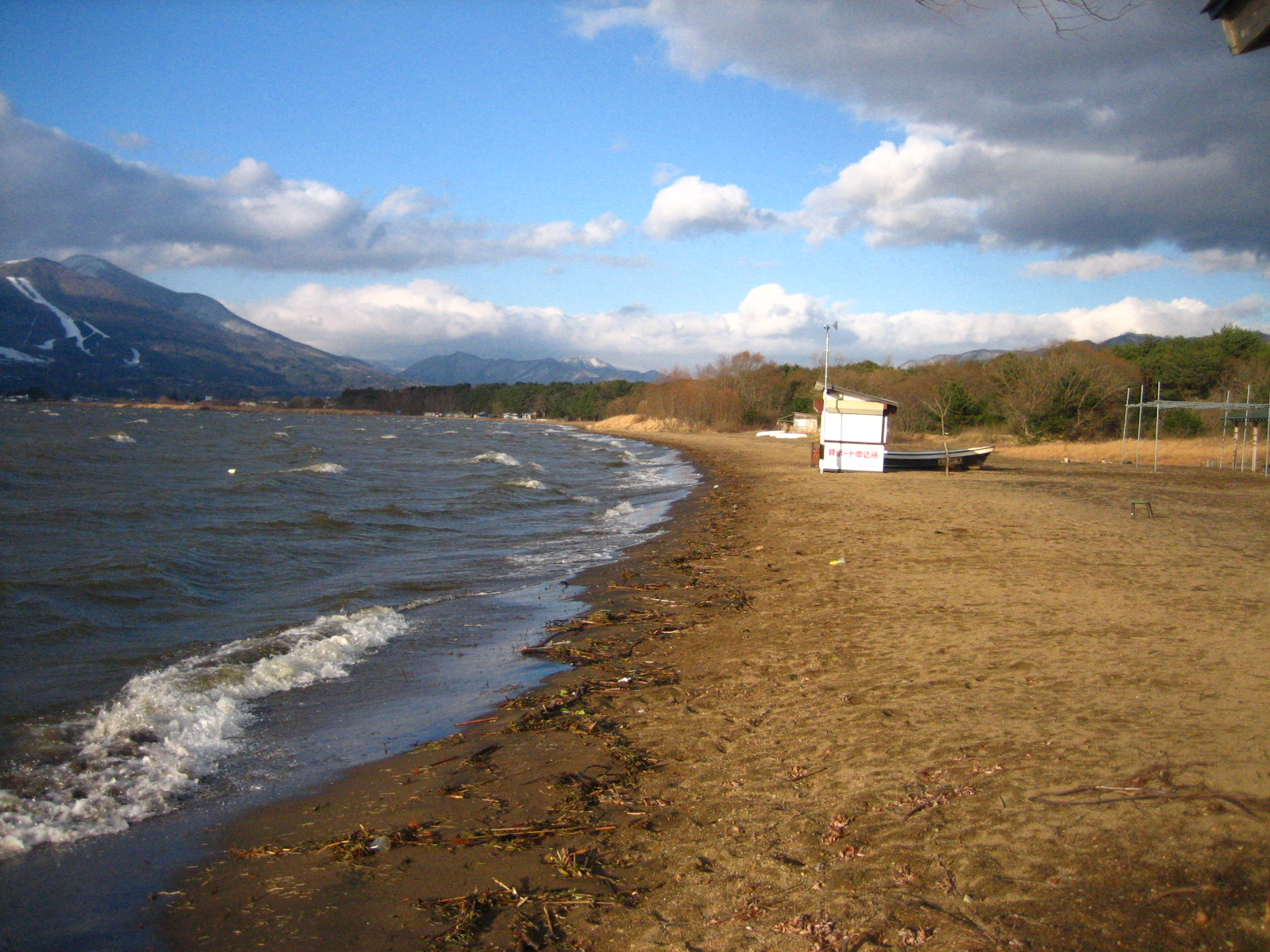
- Tenjinhama in winter

- Location within Japan
- Coordinates: 37°31′3.9″N 140°6′53.2″E
- Location: Japan

Tenjin Beach (天神浜, Tenjinhama) is a recreational beach on Lake Inawashiro in Fukushima Prefecture, Japan. On August 18, 1925, Tenjin Beach was the site of the first Boy Scouts of Japan camping trip. Members of the Imperial Family, including Crown Prince Hirohito and Prince Chichibu, attended the event. In winter, strong winds and waves form natural ice sculptures on shoreline vegetation, attracting many amateur photographers to a 1 kilometer stretch of Tenjin Beach.

== Kobirakata shrine ==
Kobirakata shrine (小平潟天満宮, Kobirakata Tenman-gū), located at Tenjin Beach, is a Tenjin shrine of scholarship, dedicated to the deified Sugawara no Michizane. It is one of three major Tenjin shrines in Japan, the other two being Dazaifu Tenman-gū in Dazaifu, Fukuoka and Kitano Tenman-gū in Kamigyō-ku, Kyoto. It was first built on June 25, 948. According to the Inawashiro Board of Education, in 1682 at the beginning of the Edo period a larger shrine replaced it when the Aizu lord Hoshina Masatsune (保科正経) requested one be built. Doctor Hideyo Noguchi frequented Kobirakata shrine when he lived in Inawashiro.

== Gallery ==
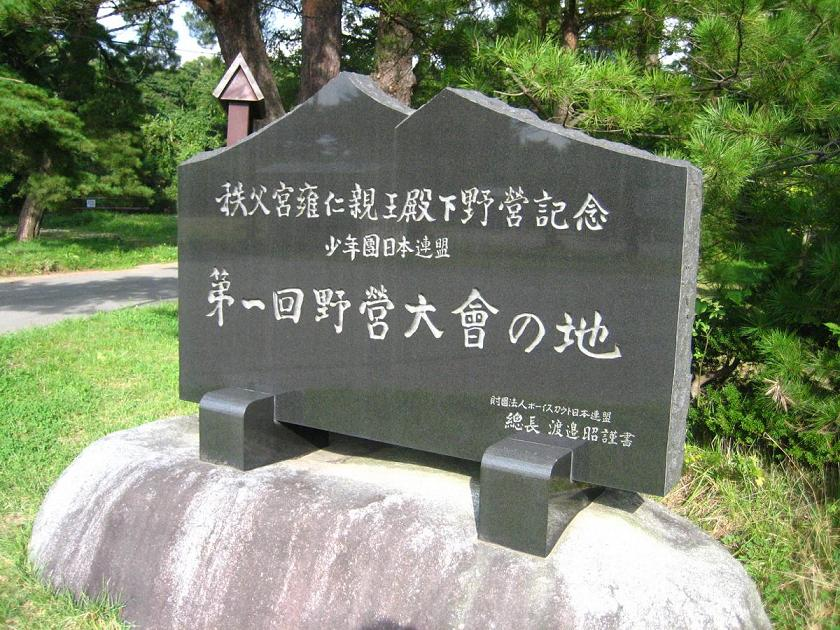
Commemorative plaque dedicated by Akira Watanabe (渡辺昭), the Boy Scouts of Japan National President (1974-2003), stating that Tenjinhama is the site of the first Boy Scouts of Japan camping trip attended by the Imperial Family

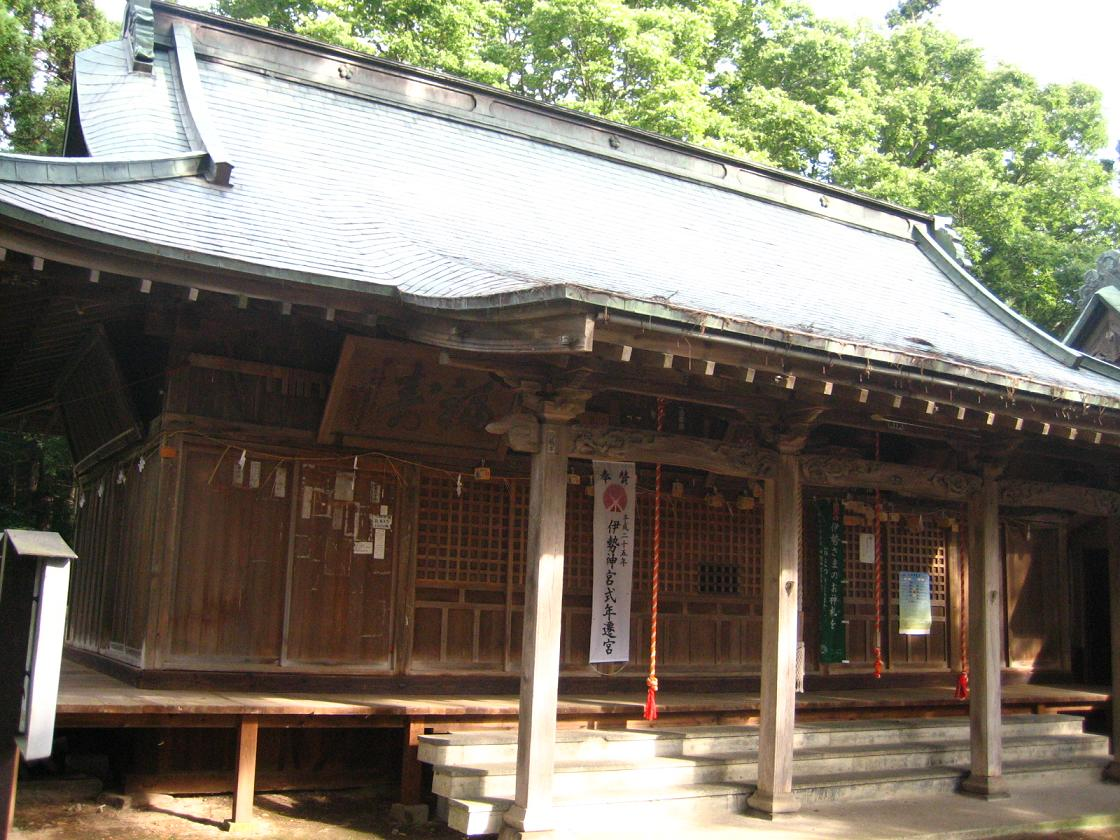
Kobirakata Shrine
