= Masataka Kawase =

Japanese diplomat

Viscount Masataka Kawase
- 河瀬 真孝
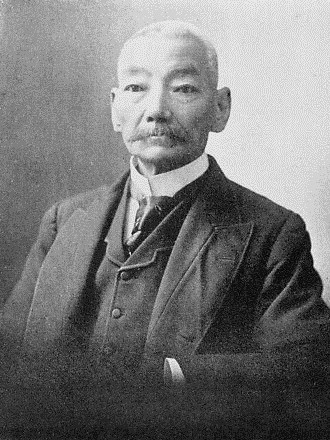

Grand Chamberlain to the Emperor
- In office 20 September 1871 – 30 September 1873 Serving with Tokudaiji Sanetsune, Higashikuze Michitomi
- Monarch: Meiji
- Preceded by: Position established
- Succeeded by: Yamaguchi Tadasada (1878); Yoneda Torao (1878)

Member of the Privy Council
- In office 10 February 1894 – 29 September 1919
- Monarchs: Meiji; Taishō

Personal details
- Born: 12 March 1840 Yoshiki, Suō, Japan
- Died: 29 September 1919 (aged 79)
- Resting place: Aoyama Cemetery

Viscount Masataka Kawase (河瀬 真孝, Kawase Masataka; 12 March 1840 – 29 September 1919), a.k.a. Kogorō Ishikawa (石川 小五郎, Ishikawa Kogorō) was a Japanese Shishi, and later, a diplomat. He attended a battle in the 1860s at Chōshū Domain. Especially, in 1865, he was the commander in Kōzan-ji uprising, as Itō Hirobumi, under Shinsaku Takasugi. He also served at the Second Chōshū expedition, and led the Chōshū Army to win.

In the 1870s, Kawase served as Japanese Minister to Rome. In 1876, he concluded successfully negotiations with Italian sculptor Vincenzo Ragusa to take a teaching position at the newly opened government sponsored art school in Tokyo. Kawase later served as Japanese Consul in London from 1884 to 1893. In 1894, he became a member of the Privy Council until his death in 1919.
