= Board of Chamberlains =

Body of the Japanese imperial court

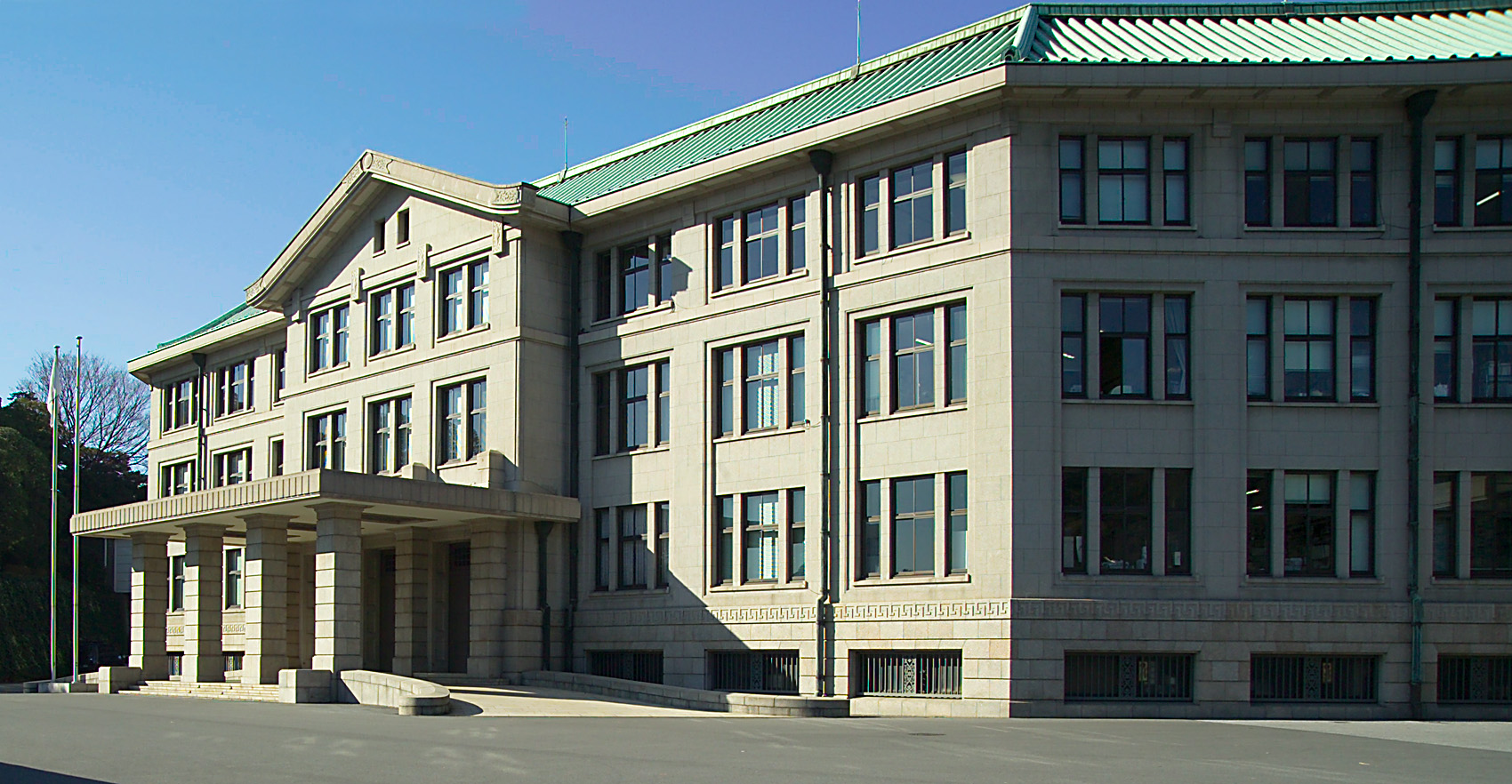
The Imperial Household Agency where the office of the Board of Chamberlains is located

The Board of Chamberlains (侍従職, Jijū-shoku) is a department of the Imperial Household Agency of Japan.

== History ==
According to Taihō Code around the 8th century, it was presupposed that a chamberlain belonged to the Ministry of the Center. When the kurōdodokoro (蔵人所) was installed during the Heian era, the chamberlain's role was quickly reduced, limited to matters of courtesy. In 1869, the chamberlain was brought into the Imperial Household Ministry. The position of Grand Chamberlain was placed within the merit system in 1871, and three people—Tokudaiji Sanetsune, Masataka Kawase, and Higashikuze Michitomi—were appointed. According to the Imperial Household Ministry regulations, the Grand Chamberlain supervises chamberlains who closely attend to the appointed person, report to that person, and announce their orders.

After World War II, the chamberlains were organized into the Board of the Chamberlains, within the Imperial Household Agency, through the temporary Imperial Household office (宮内府, kunaifu). After the passage of the National Public Service Law (Shōwa 22 Law No. 120), the chamberlain became a special service national public servant. Although distinctions between first-class officials, second-class officials, and so forth continued, the class publication of an appointment document would no longer be carried out after the 2001 Central Government Reform.

== Organisation ==
The Grand Chamberlain (侍従長, Jijūchō) is a chief functionary of the Imperial court and aide of the Emperor of Japan. He also keeps the Privy Seal and the State Seal and has been an official civil servant since the Meiji Period. Today, the Grand Chamberlain, assisted by a Vice-Grand Chamberlain, heads the Board of the Chamberlains.

The Grand Chamberlain's position is that of an attestation official (認証官 Ninshōkan), i.e. his appointment and dismissal are at the discretion of the Emperor.

== Crown Prince ==
The Crown Prince of Japan is also served by a chamberlain. This official is called East Palace Chamberlain (東宮侍従, Tōgū-jijū) because the Crown Prince lives in the Tōgū Palace ("East Palace"). The Grand Master is the head of the Board of the Crown Prince's Household.

== Grand Chamberlains ==
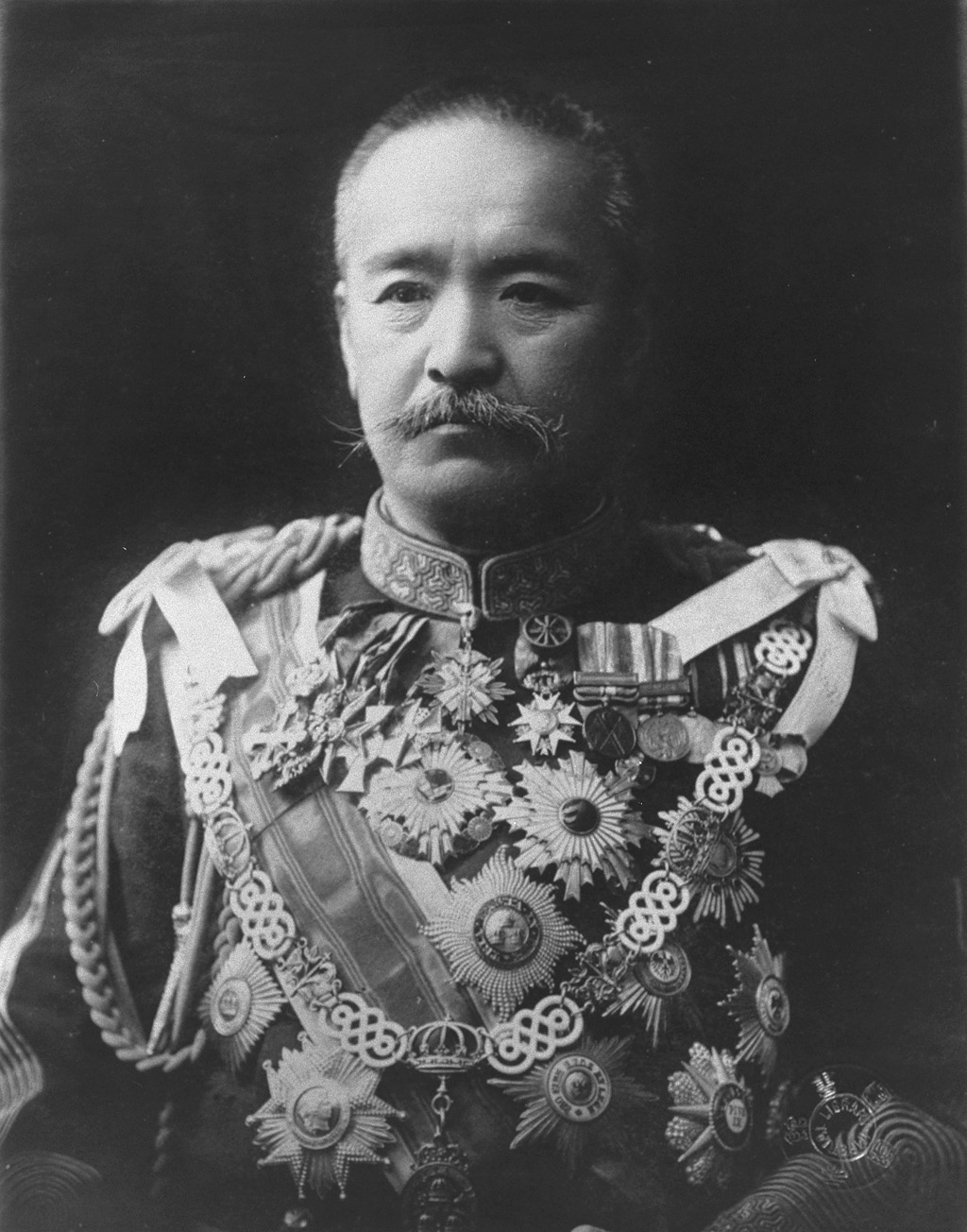
Prince Katsura Tarō, Grand Chamberlain 1912

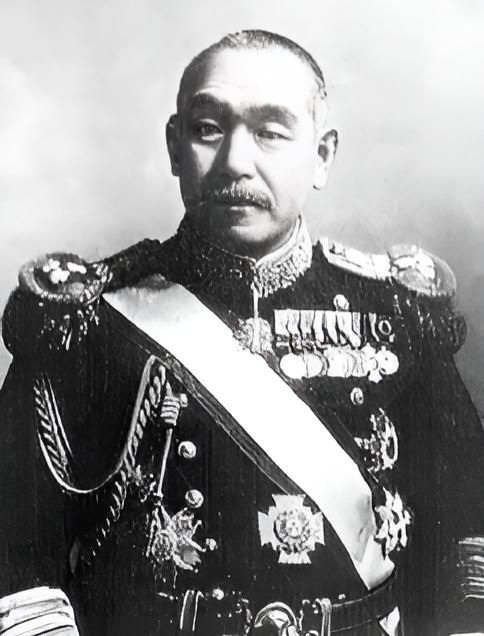
Baron Suzuki Kantarō, Grand Chamberlain 1929–36

This is a list of grand chamberlains after the Meiji period:

- Prince Tokudaiji Sanetsune (徳大寺実則), 1871–77
- Viscount Kawase Masataka (河瀬真孝), 1871–73
- Count Higashikuze Michitomi (東久世通禧), 1871–77
- Yamaguchi Tadasada (山口正定), 1878–84
- Yoneda Torao (米田虎雄), 1878–84
- Prince Tokudaiji Sanetsune (徳大寺実則), 1884–12
- Baron Hatano Norinao (波多野敬直), 1912
- Prince Katsura Tarō (桂太郎), 1912
- Prince Takatsukasa Hiromichi (鷹司煕通), 1912–18
- Count Ogimachi Sanemasa (正親町実正), 1919–22
- Count Tokugawa Satotaka (徳川達孝), 1922–27
- Count Chinda Sutemi (珍田捨巳), 1927–1929
- Baron Suzuki Kantarō (鈴木貫太郎), 1929–36
- Hyakutake Saburō (百武三郎), 1936–44
- Fujita Hisanori (藤田尚徳), 1944–47

After enforcement of the Constitution of Japan by the end of World War II:

- Ōgane Masujirō (大金益次郎), 1947–48
- Mitani Takanobu (三谷隆信), 1948–65
- Inada Syūichi (稲田周一), 1965–69
- Irie Sukemasa (入江相政), 1969–85
- Tokugawa Yoshihiro (徳川義寛), 1985–88
- Yamamoto Satoru (山本悟), 1988–96
- Watanabe Makoto (渡邉允, 12 December 1996 – 2007
- Kawashima Yutaka (川島裕), 2007–2015
- Kawai Chikao (河相周夫), 2015–2019
- Odano Nobutake (小田野展丈), 2019–2021
- Bessho Koro (別所浩郎), 2021–present

== See also ==
- Aide-de-camp to the Emperor of Japan
- Grand Steward's Secretariat
- Board of Ceremonies
