= Ken Harada (diplomat) =

Japanese diplomat

His Excellency (閣下, Kakka) Ken Harada
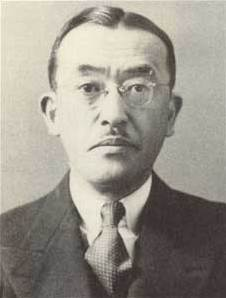

Special Minister of Japan to the Holy See
- In office April 1942 – 1945

Chargé d'affaires from Japan to Vichy France
- In office 1941–1942

Ambassador of Japan to Italy
- In office 1952–1955

Personal details
- Born: 1893 Kyoto
- Died: September 18, 1973 (aged 80)
- Education: Tokyo University

Ken Harada (原田 健, Harada Ken; born 1893 - September 18, 1973) was a chargé d'affaires to Vichy France and a diplomat to the Holy See from Japan. He was appointed as a special envoy to the Vatican, and served in this capacity from 1942 to 1945. He was the first diplomatic representative to the Vatican from Japan.

== Early diplomatic career ==
During the 1920s, Harada worked at the Secretariat of the League of Nations.

== Diplomat to the Holy See ==
In 1942, the Holy See began de facto diplomatic relations with Japan, though the United States and United Kingdom protested. Ken Harada was made the first Japanese special envoy to the Holy See, and Archbishop Paolo Marella became the Nuncio to Japan. Harada arrived in the Vatican City in April 1942, and was officially received on May 9, 1942. Harada expressed Japan's desire for peace to Pope Pius XII on occasion, a year before Japan agreed to peace. The Japanese government denied that Harada had expressed a willingness for the country to negotiate peace, declaring the report was "so absurd it is not worth the trouble to deny," though people close to the Vatican confirmed that the meeting had occurred. Following the Allied occupation of Rome in June 1944, Harada was briefly harassed by US troops that entered his residence in Rome outside Vatican walls, but he was allowed to remain in his position.

Upon the end of Harada's appointment, Pope Pius XII knighted Harada in January 1946 into the Order of St. Sylvester.

== Later diplomatic career ==
Harada served as Japan's ambassador to Italy after World War II from 1952 to 1955.

== Grand master of the ceremonies ==
He later obtained a post as the Grand Master of the Ceremonies with the Imperial Household Agency.

== Bibliography ==
- Quigley, Martin (1991). Peace without Hiroshima: secret action at the Vatican in the spring of 1945 (snippet). Madison Books. ISBN 9784022561312.
- Harada, Ken, ed. (1971). 原田助遺集 (Harada Tasuku ishū). University of California. (papers of the father, Tasuku Harada, president of Dōshisha University)
- Harada, Wakako, ed. (1974). 原田健遺集 (Harada Ken ishū). Kawakita Insatsu Kabushiki Kaisha. (item not on sale)
- Les problèmes du Japon d'aujourd'hui. Banco di Roma. 1954.
- Blet, Pierre (2000). Pius XII and the Second World War, according to the Archives of the Vatican.
