= Inada Syūichi =

Japanese politician

- 稲田 周一

Grand Chamberlain to the Emperor
- In office 30 March 1965 – 16 September 1969
- Monarch: Hirohito
- Preceded by: Mitani Takanobu
- Succeeded by: Sukemasa Irie

Governor of Shiga Prefecture
- In office 21 April 1945 – 25 January 1946
- Monarch: Hirohito
- Preceded by: Morito Kikuchi
- Succeeded by: Wakio Shibano

Personal details
- Born: 26 February 1902 Tokyo, Japan
- Died: 5 February 1973 (aged 70) Chiyoda, Tokyo, Japan
- Education: Tokyo Imperial University

Inada Syūichi (稲田 周一, Inada Shūichi; 26 February 1902 – 5 February 1973) was a Japanese Home Ministry government official and politician. He was born in Niigata Prefecture. He was a graduate of Tokyo Imperial University. He was governor of Shiga Prefecture (1945–1946). He was Grand Chamberlain of Japan (1965–1969).

== Bibliography ==
- 歴代知事編纂会編『新編日本の歴代知事』歴代知事編纂会、1991年。
- 秦郁彦編『日本官僚制総合事典：1868 - 2000』東京大学出版会、2001年。
- 秦郁彦編『日本近現代人物履歴事典』東京大学出版会、2002年。

Preceded by Mitani Takanobu	Grand Chamberlain of Japan; 1965–1969	Succeeded by Irie Sukemasa
