= Paolo Marella =

Italian cardinal (1895–1984)

His Eminence Paolo Marella
- Vice-Dean of the College of Cardinals
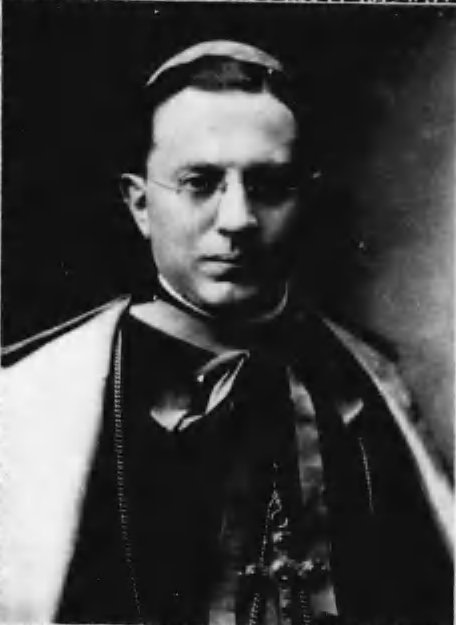
- Marella circa 1942.
- Church: Roman Catholic Church
- Appointed: 12 December 1977
- Term ended: 15 October 1984
- Predecessor: Carlo Confalonieri
- Successor: Sebastiano Baggio
- Other post: Cardinal-Bishop of Porto e Santa Rufina (1972–84)
- Previous posts: Titular Archbishop of Doclea (1933–59); Apostolic Delegate to Japan (1933–48); Apostolic Delegate to Oceania (1948–53); Apostolic Delegate to Australia (1948–53); Apostolic Delegate to New Zealand (1948–53); Apostolic Nuncio to France (1953–59); Apostolic Pro-Nuncio to France (1959–60); Cardinal-Priest of Sant'Andrea delle Fratte (1960–72); President of the Congregation of the Reverend Basilica of Saint Peter (1961–67); Archpriest of Saint Peter's Basilica (1961–83); President of the Secretariat for Non-Christians (1964–73); President of the Fabric of Saint Peter (1967–83)

Orders
- Ordination: 23 February 1918 by Basilio Pompili
- Consecration: 29 October 1933 by Pietro Fumasoni Biondi
- Created cardinal: 14 December 1959 by Pope John XXIII
- Rank: Cardinal-Priest (1960–72); Cardinal-Bishop (1972–84)

Personal details
- Born: Paolo Marella; 25 January 1895 Rome, Kingdom of Italy
- Died: 15 October 1984 (aged 89) Rome, Italy
- Buried: Campo Verano
- Parents: Luigi Marella; Vincenza Baldoni
- Education: Pontifical Major Roman Seminary; La Sapienza University
- Motto: Ipsam sequens non devias

Styles of Paolo Marella
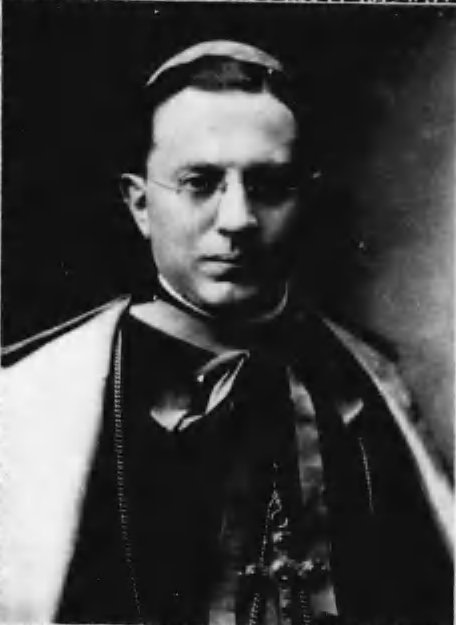
- Reference style: His Eminence
- Spoken style: Your Eminence
- Informal style: Cardinal
- See: Porto e Santa Rufina (suburbicarian)

Paolo Marella (25 January 1895 – 15 October 1984) was an Italian cardinal of the Roman Catholic Church. He served in the Roman Curia following a career as a delegate of the Holy See, and was elevated to the cardinalate by Pope John XXIII in 1959.

== Biography ==
Marella was born in Rome to Luigi and Vincenza (née Baldoni) Marella, and studied at the Pontifical Roman Seminary and the La Sapienza University. He was ordained to the priesthood by Cardinal Basilio Pompili on 23 February 1918, and then furthered his studies whilst doing pastoral work in Rome until 1922.

From 1922 to 1924, Marella was an official of the Sacred Congregation for the Propagation of the Faith in the Roman Curia. He was raised to the rank of Privy Chamberlain of His Holiness on 9 January 1923, and later Domestic Prelate of His Holiness on 5 April 1933. He then served as auditor (1924–1933) and chargé d'affaires (February to September 1933) of the Apostolic Delegation to the United States.

On 15 September 1933, Marella was appointed Titular Archbishop of Doclea by Pope Pius XI. He received his episcopal consecration on the following 29 October from Cardinal Pietro Fumasoni Biondi, with Archbishops Carlo Salotti and Domenico Spolverini serving as co-consecrators, at the chapel of the Collegio de Propaganda Fide in Rome. Marella was named Apostolic Delegate to Japan the next day, on 30 October. In 1942, when the Vatican accepted de facto diplomatic relations with Japan, Marella was given "full diplomatic privileges". He was made Apostolic Delegate to Australia, New Zealand, and Oceania on 27 October 1948.

Also in the 1940s, Marella was sent to France as an agent of Pope Pius XII when he was aiming to stamp out the Worker-Priest movement that the Pope believed Cardinal Emmanuel Célestin Suhard had been supporting despite his protests otherwise. Marella succeeded Archbishop Angelo Roncalli (the future Pope John XXIII) as Nuncio to France on 15 April 1953.

Pope John XXIII created him a cardinal at the consistory held on 14 December 1959 and he received his red biretta in Paris from President Charles de Gaulle. He announced him as Cardinal-Priest of Sant'Andrea delle Fratte in the consistory of 28 March 1960. Appointed Archpriest of St. Peter's Basilica and Prefect of the Sacred Congregation of the Fabric of St. Peter's Basilica on 14 August 1961, Marella attended the Second Vatican Council from 1962 to 1965, presenting there a draft of the text which was to become Christus Dominus, the Decree on the Pastoral Office of Bishops in the Church. He was one of the cardinal electors who participated in the 1963 papal conclave, which elected Pope Paul VI.

He acted as papal legate to the inauguration of the Vatican pavilion at the New York World's Fair, presiding over the unveiling of the Pietà on 20 April 1964. Marella received four honorary doctorates on this visit to the United States, including one from the Catholic University of America, which had prohibited four liberal theologians from delivering lectures there the previous year, for which Marella commended the university.

He became President of the Secretariat for Non-Christians on 19 May 1964, and again served as a papal legate, to the eighth centennial celebration of the erection of Notre-Dame Cathedral in Paris (27 May 1964), to the centennial celebration for the arrival of the first Catholic missionaries in Japan in Tokyo (12 January 1965), and to the National Congress of the Confraternity of Christian Doctrine in Pittsburgh (28 August 1966).

In 1970, Marella served as the papal representative to Expo '70 in Osaka. He resigned his presidency of the Secretariat at the end of February 1973. From 12 December 1977 until his death, Marella was vice-dean of the College of Cardinals.

Catholic Church titles
Preceded by none	President of the Pontifical Council for Interreligious Dialogue; 19 May 1964 – 26 February 1973	Succeeded by Sergio Pignedoli
Preceded by Carlo Confalonieri	Vice-Dean of the College of Cardinals; 12 December 1977 – 15 October 1984	Succeeded by vacant Title next held by Sebastiano Baggio
