= Koichi Haraguchi =

Japanese diplomat (1940–2009)

Koichi Haraguchi (原口 幸市, Haraguchi Kōichi; November 24, 1940 – October 4, 2009) was a former Japanese diplomat and the Grand Master of Ceremonies of the Imperial Household Agency.

== Biography ==
Haraguchi was born in 1940 in Tokyo. He attended Hibiya High School, and attended college at the University of Tokyo. After graduating, he entered the Ministry of Foreign Affairs in 1964 and rose through the ranks. After serving as the consul general in Los Angeles, he became the Director-General of Economic Affairs Bureau, and later the Deputy Minister for Foreign Affairs. Haraguchi also served as the ambassador extraordinary and plenipotentiary to both the Japanese diplomatic mission in Geneva and the United Nations.

He was also the chief negotiator on North Korean issues, as well as the ambassador in charge of normalisation talks with North Korea.

In July 2007, Haraguchi was appointed to the Grand Master of the Ceremonies of the Imperial Household Agency.

== Death ==
On October 4, 2009, while climbing Mt. Amakazari with colleagues in Niigata, he fell unconscious near the summit and was evacuated to a hospital, but died from sudden cardiac arrest.

== See also ==
- Sadako Ogata, also former Ambassador to United Nations
- Hisashi Owada, also former Deputy Minister for Foreign Affairs and former Ambassador to United Nations
