= Tokudaiji Sanesada =

12th century Japanese poet

Tokudaiji Sanesada 徳大寺実定
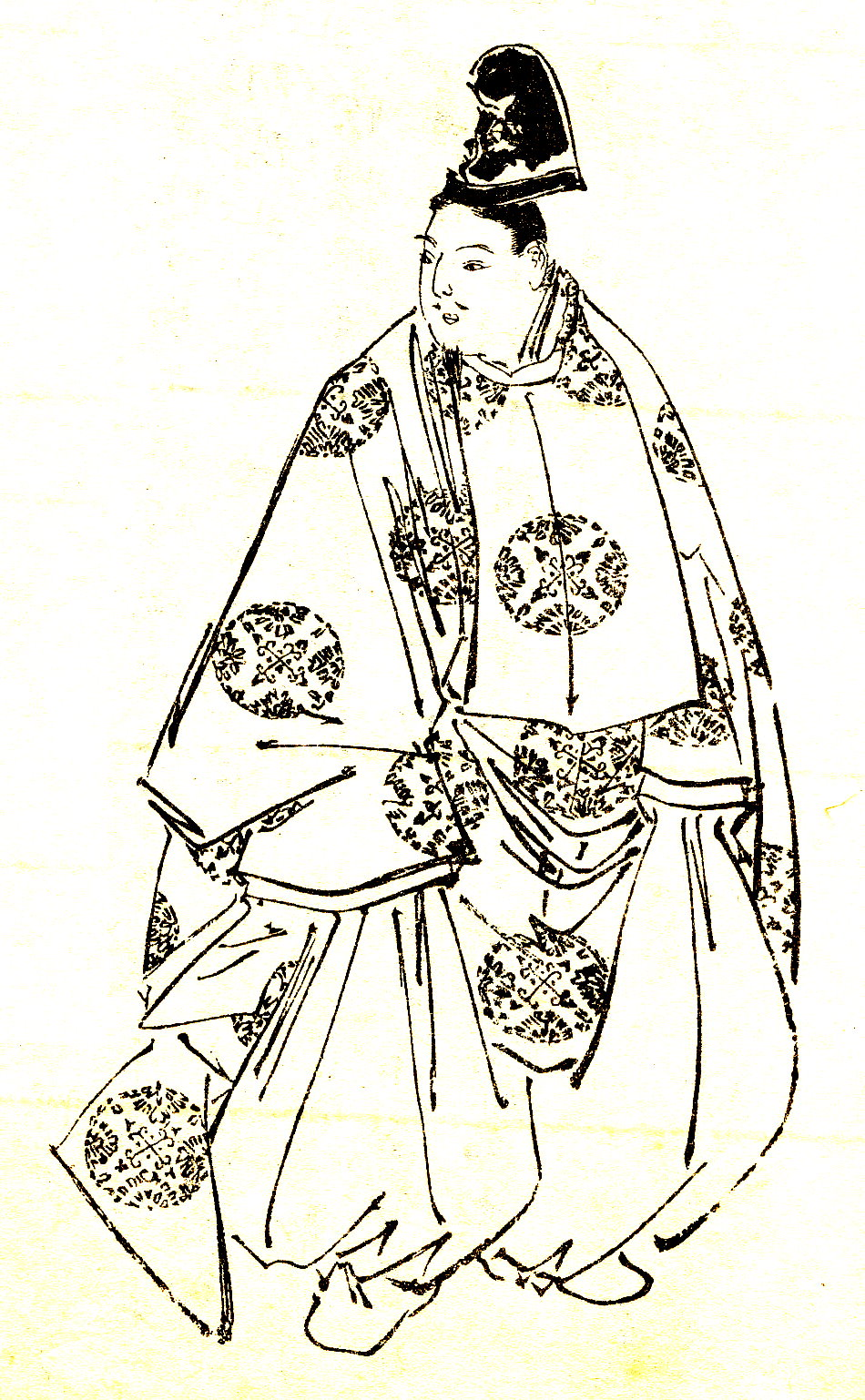
- Tokudaiji Sanesada
- Born: 1139
- Died: 1192 (aged 52–53)
- Occupations: nobleman, politician

Tokudaiji Sanesada (徳大寺 実定; 1139–1192) was a Japanese waka poet and nobleman during the Heian period.

He is also known as the Later Tokudaiji Minister of the Left (後徳大寺左大臣, Go-Tokudaiji no Sadaijin), having served as Sadaijin in the Heian imperial administration.

== Poetry ==
One of his poems is included in Hyakunin Isshu:

ほととぎす鳴きつる方をながむれば
ただ有明の月ぞ残れる
hototogisu nakitsuru kata o nagamureba
tada ariake no tsuki zo nokoreru
(Senzai Wakashū 3:161)
