= Yutaka Kawashima =

Japanese diplomat

- 川島 裕

Grand Chamberlain to the Emperor
- In office 15 June 2007 – 1 May 2015
- Monarch: Akihito
- Preceded by: Makoto Watanabe
- Succeeded by: Chikao Kawai

Personal details
- Born: 2 May 1942 (age 84)
- Education: University of Tokyo; University of Cambridge

Yutaka Kawashima (Japanese: 川島裕; born 2 May 1942) was a Japanese diplomat who served as Grand Chamberlain to the Emperor from 2007 to 2015. During his diplomatic career, he was Ambassador of Japan to Israel (1997–1999) and Vice Minister (1999–2001).

He is a graduate of the University of Tokyo and the University of Cambridge.

After retirement he worked at the Brookings Institution and taught at the John F. Kennedy School of Government. In 2003, he published the book Japanese Foreign Policy at the Crossroads.

He served as Grand Chamberlain to the Emperor from 2007 to 2015.

== Honours ==
- Netherlands: Grand Officer of the Order of Orange-Nassau (29 October 2014)

Preceded by Shunji Yanai	Vice Minister for Foreign Affairs; 1999–2001	Succeeded by Yoshiji Nogami
Preceded by Makoto Watanabe	Grand Chamberlain to the Emperor; 2007–2015	Succeeded by Chikao Kawai
