= Taishō era =

Period of Japanese history from 1912 to 1926

Taishō 大正
- 30 July 1912 – 25 December 1926
Meiji	Shōwa
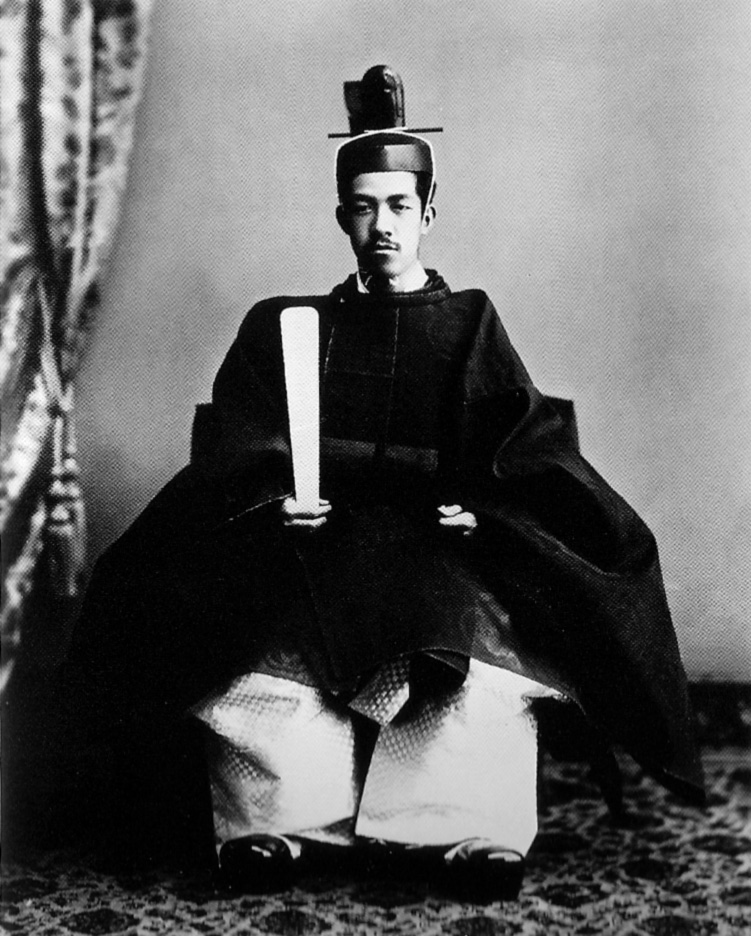
- Emperor Taishō (1900)
- Location: Japan
- Including: Taishō Democracy; World War I; Siege of Tsingtao; Allied occupation of German New Guinea; Japanese occupation of German colonial possessions; Occupation of Istanbul; Japanese intervention in Siberia; Great Kantō earthquake
- Monarch(s): Taishō; Hirohito, Crown Prince (Sesshō)
- Prime Ministers: Saionji Kinmochi; Katsura Tarō; Yamamoto Gonnohyōe; Ōkuma Shigenobu; Terauchi Masatake; Hara Takashi; Uchida Kōsai (acting); Takahashi Korekiyo; Katō Tomosaburō; Kiyoura Keigo; Katō Takaaki; Wakatsuki Reijirō

The Taishō era (大正時代, Taishō jidai; [taiɕoː dʑidai]) was a period in the history of Japan dating from July 30, 1912, to December 25, 1926, coinciding with the reign of Emperor Taishō. The new emperor brought on the shift in political power from the old oligarchic group of elder statesmen (or genrō) to the Imperial Diet of Japan and the democratic parties. Thus, the era is considered the time of the liberal movement known as Taishō Democracy; it is usually distinguished from the preceding chaotic Meiji era and the following militaristic-driven first part of the Shōwa era.

== Etymology ==
The two kanji characters in Taishō (大正) were from a passage of the Classical Chinese I Ching: 大亨以正 天之道也 (translated: "Great prevalence is achieved through rectitude, and this is the Dao of Heaven.") The term could be roughly understood as meaning "great rectitude", or "great righteousness".

== Meiji legacy ==
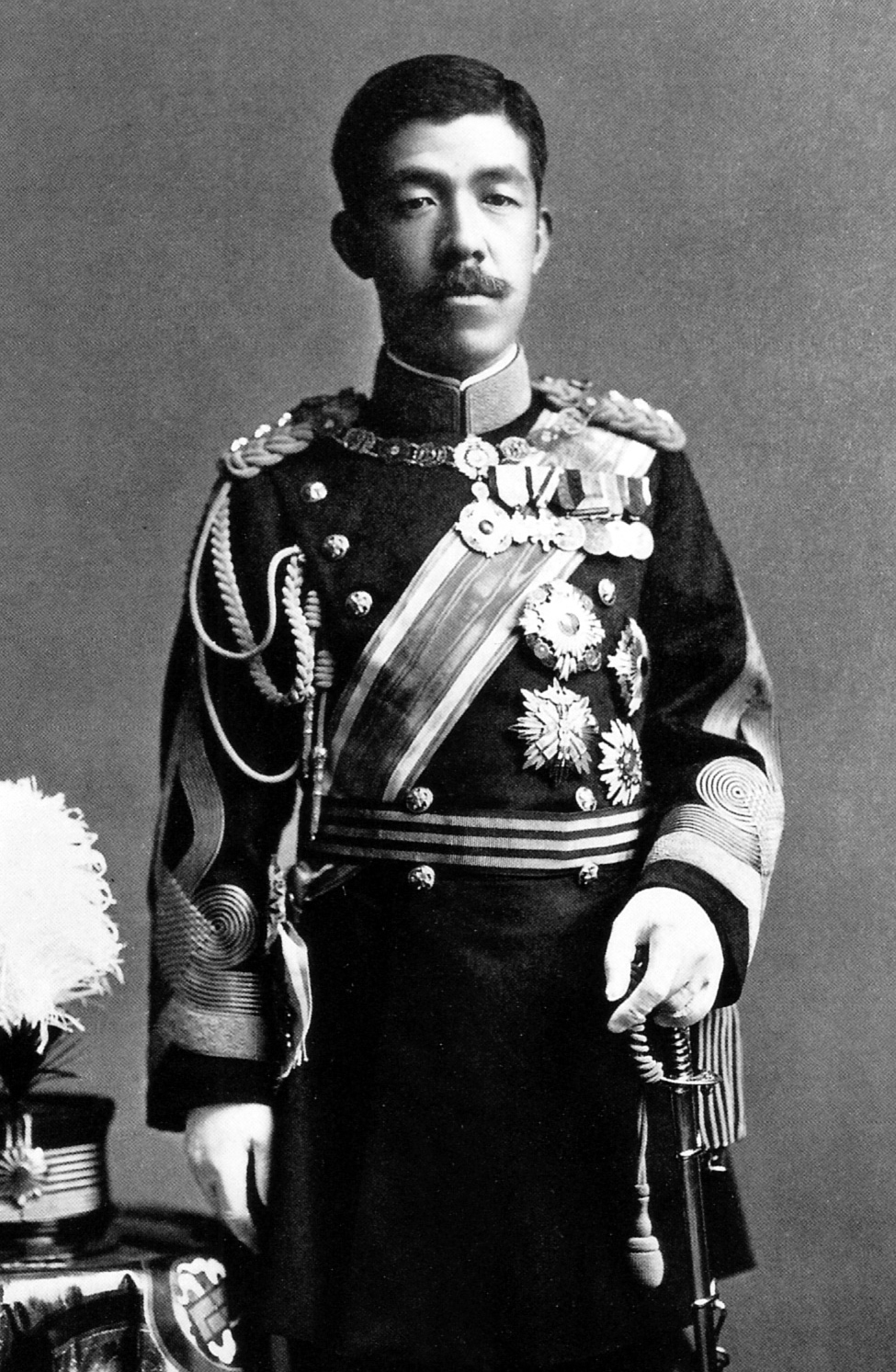
Emperor Taishō in 1912

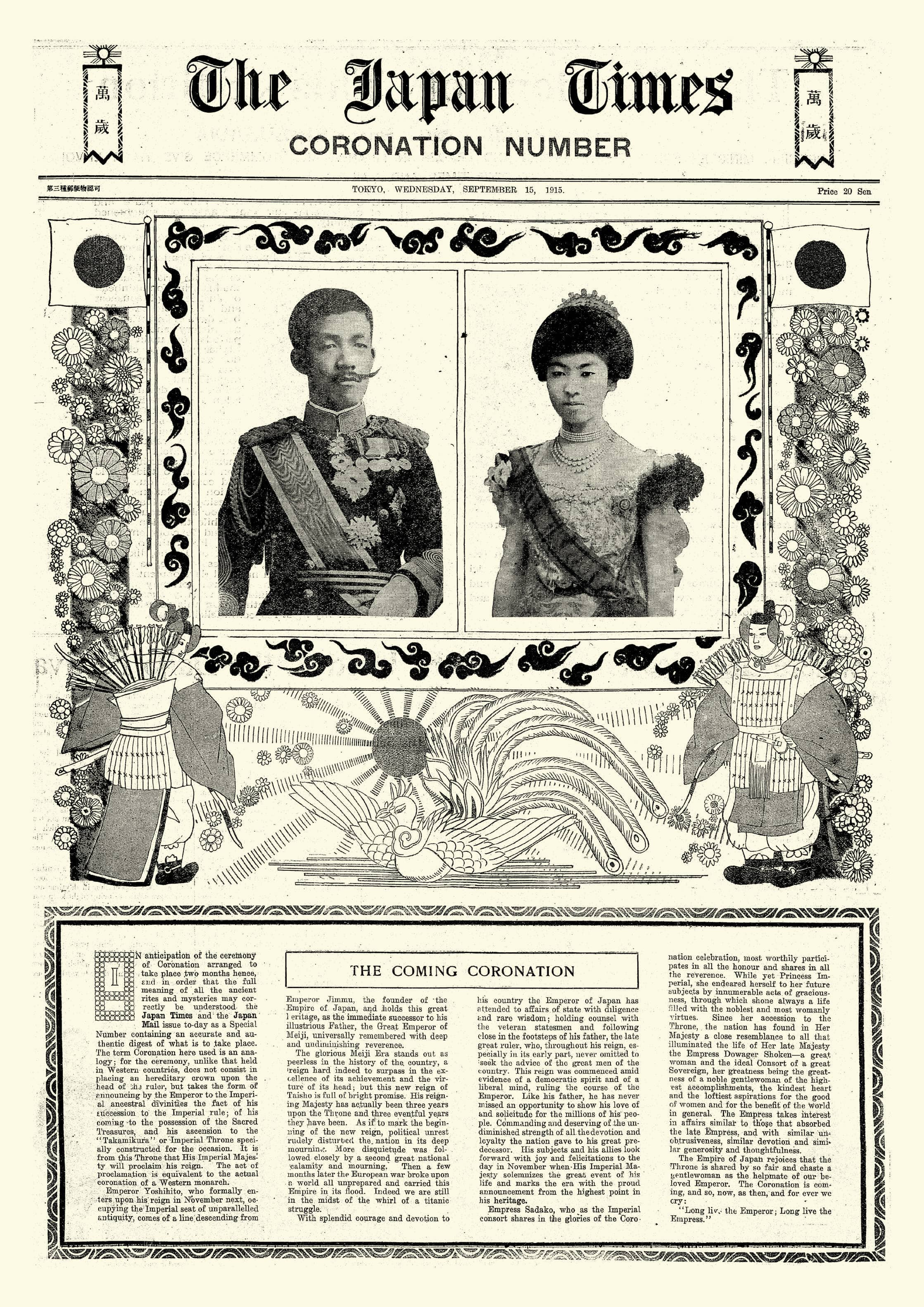
The Japan Times front page about the coronation of Emperor Taishō and Empress Teimei (15 September 1915)

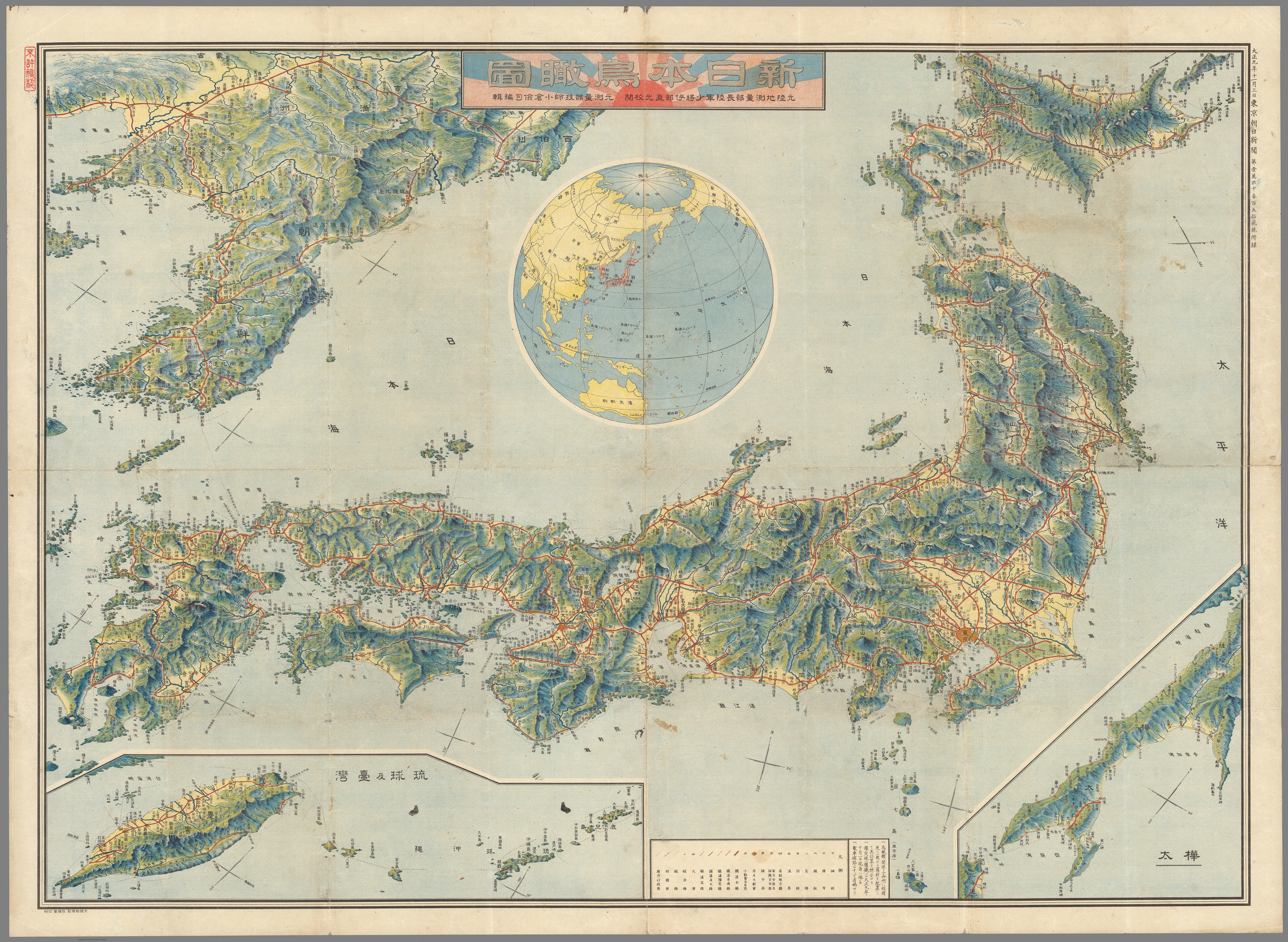
Map of the Empire of Japan in November 1918

On July 30, 1912, Emperor Meiji died and Crown Prince Yoshihito succeeded to the throne as Emperor of Japan. In his coronation address, the newly enthroned Emperor announced his reign's nengō (era name) Taishō, meaning "great righteousness".

The end of the Meiji period was marked by huge government, domestic, and overseas investments and defense programs, nearly exhausted credit, and a lack of foreign reserves to pay debts. The influence of Western culture experienced in the Meiji period also continued. Notable artists, such as Kobayashi Kiyochika, adopted Western painting styles while continuing to work in ukiyo-e; others, such as Okakura Kakuzō, kept an interest in traditional Japanese painting. Authors such as Mori Ōgai studied in the West, bringing back with them to Japan different insights on human life influenced by developments in the West.

The events following the Meiji Restoration in 1868 had seen not only the fulfillment of many domestic and foreign economic and political objectives—without Japan suffering the colonial fate of other Asian nations—but also a new intellectual ferment, in a time when there was worldwide interest in communism and socialism and an urban proletariat was developing. Universal male suffrage, social welfare, workers' rights, and nonviolent protests were ideals of the early leftist movement. Government suppression of leftist activities, however, led to more radical leftist action and even more suppression, resulting in the dissolution of the Japan Socialist Party (日本社会党, Nihon Shakaitō) only a year after its founding and general failure of the socialist movement in 1906.

The beginning of the Taishō period was marked by the Taishō political crisis in 1912–13 that interrupted the earlier politics of compromise. When Saionji Kinmochi from the right-wing Rikken Seiyūkai tried to cut the military budget, the army minister resigned, bringing down the second Saionji cabinet. Both Yamagata Aritomo and Saionji refused to resume office, and the genrō were unable to find a solution. Public outrage over the military manipulation of the cabinet and the recall of Katsura Tarō for a third term led to still more demands for an end to genrō politics. Despite old guard opposition, the conservative forces formed a party of their own in 1913, the Rikken Dōshikai, a party that won a majority in the House over the Seiyūkai in late 1914.

On February 12, 1913, Yamamoto Gonnohyōe succeeded Katsura as prime minister. In April 1914, Ōkuma Shigenobu replaced Yamamoto.

Crown Prince Yoshihito married Sadako Kujō on 10 May 1900. Their coronation took place on November 11, 1915.

== World War I and hegemony in China ==
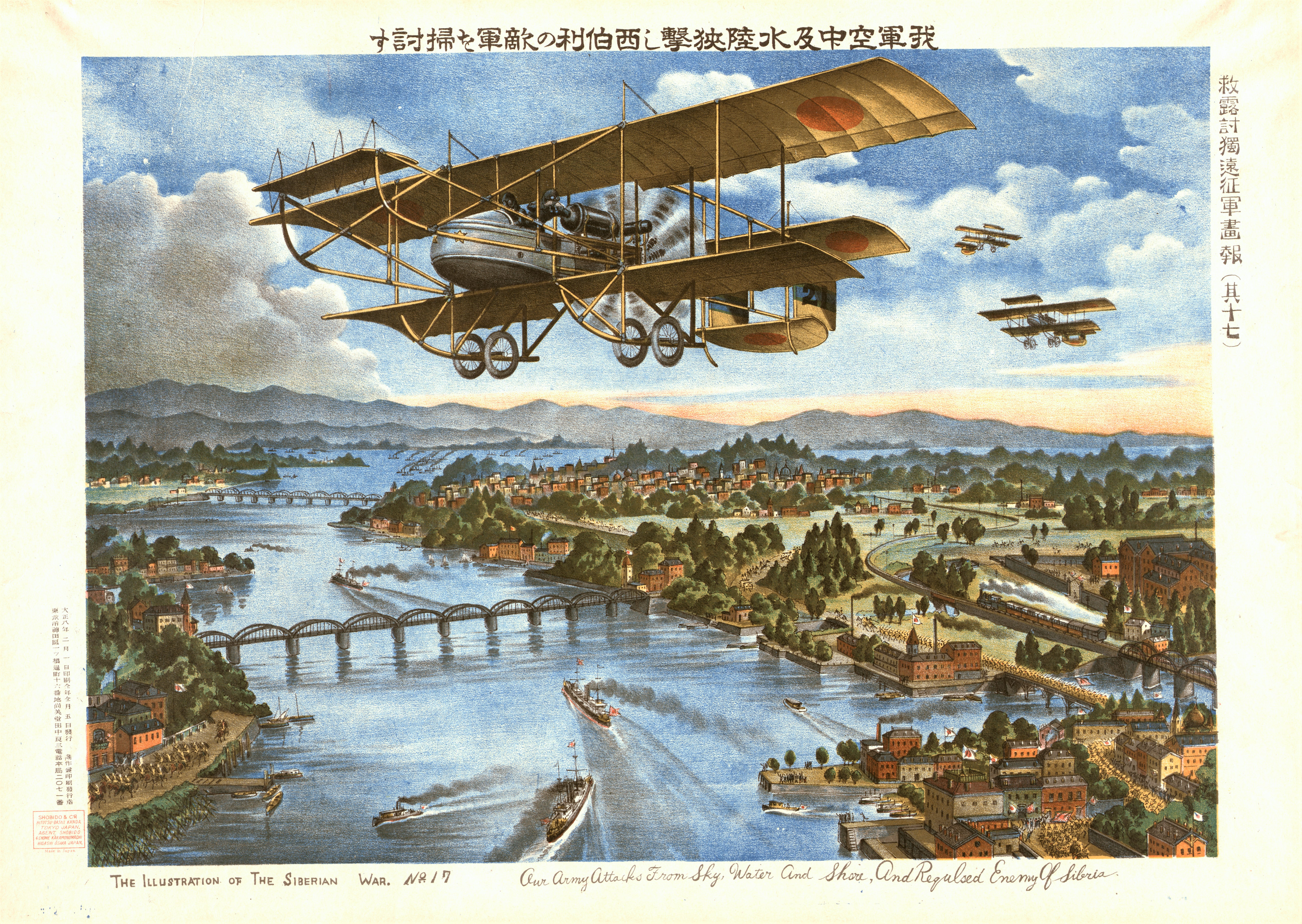
Japanese occupation of the Russian city of Khabarovsk during the Russian Civil War, 1919

World War I permitted Japan, which fought on the side of the victorious Allied Powers, to expand its influence in Asia and its territorial holdings in the north equatorial Pacific. Japan declared war on Germany on August 23, 1914, and quickly occupied German-leased territories in China's Shandong and the Mariana, Caroline, and Marshall islands in the north Pacific Ocean. On November 7, Jiaozhou surrendered to Japan.

With its Western allies heavily involved in the war in Europe, Japan sought further to consolidate its position in China by presenting the Twenty-One Demands to the Chinese Beiyang Government in January 1915. Besides expanding its control over German holdings, Manchuria and Inner Mongolia, Japan also sought joint ownership of a major mining and metallurgical complex in central China, prohibitions on China's ceding or leasing any coastal areas to a third power, and miscellaneous other political, economic and military controls, which, if achieved, would have reduced China to a Japanese protectorate. In the face of slow negotiations with the Beiyang government, widespread anti-Japanese sentiment in China and international condemnation forced Japan to withdraw the final group of demands and treaties were signed in May 1915.

Japan's hegemony in northern China and other parts of Asia was facilitated through other international agreements. One with Russia in 1916 helped further secure Japan's influence in Manchuria and Inner Mongolia, and agreements with France, Britain, and the United States in 1917 recognized Japan's territorial gains in China and the north Pacific. The Nishihara Loans (named after Nishihara Kamezo, Tokyo's representative in Beijing) of 1917 and 1918, while aiding the Chinese government, put China still deeper into Japan's debt. Toward the end of the war, Japan increasingly filled orders for its European allies' needed war material, thus helping to diversify the country's industry, increase its exports, and transform Japan from a debtor to a creditor nation for the first time.

Japan's power in Asia grew following the collapse of the Imperial Russian government in 1917 after the Russian Revolution. Wanting to seize the opportunity, the Japanese army planned to occupy Siberia as far west as Lake Baikal. To do so, Japan had to negotiate an agreement with China allowing the transit of Japanese troops through Chinese territory. Although the force was scaled back to avoid antagonizing the United States, more than 70,000 Japanese troops joined the much smaller units of the Allied expeditionary force sent to Siberia in July 1918 as part of the Allied intervention in the Russian Civil War.

On October 9, 1916, Terauchi Masatake took over as prime minister from Ōkuma Shigenobu. On November 2, 1917, the Lansing–Ishii Agreement noted the recognition of Japan's interests in China and pledges of keeping an "Open Door Policy". From July to September 1918, rice riots erupted due to increasing price of rice. The large scale rioting and collapse of public order led to the end of Terauchi Masatake government.

== Japan after World War I: Taishō Democracy ==
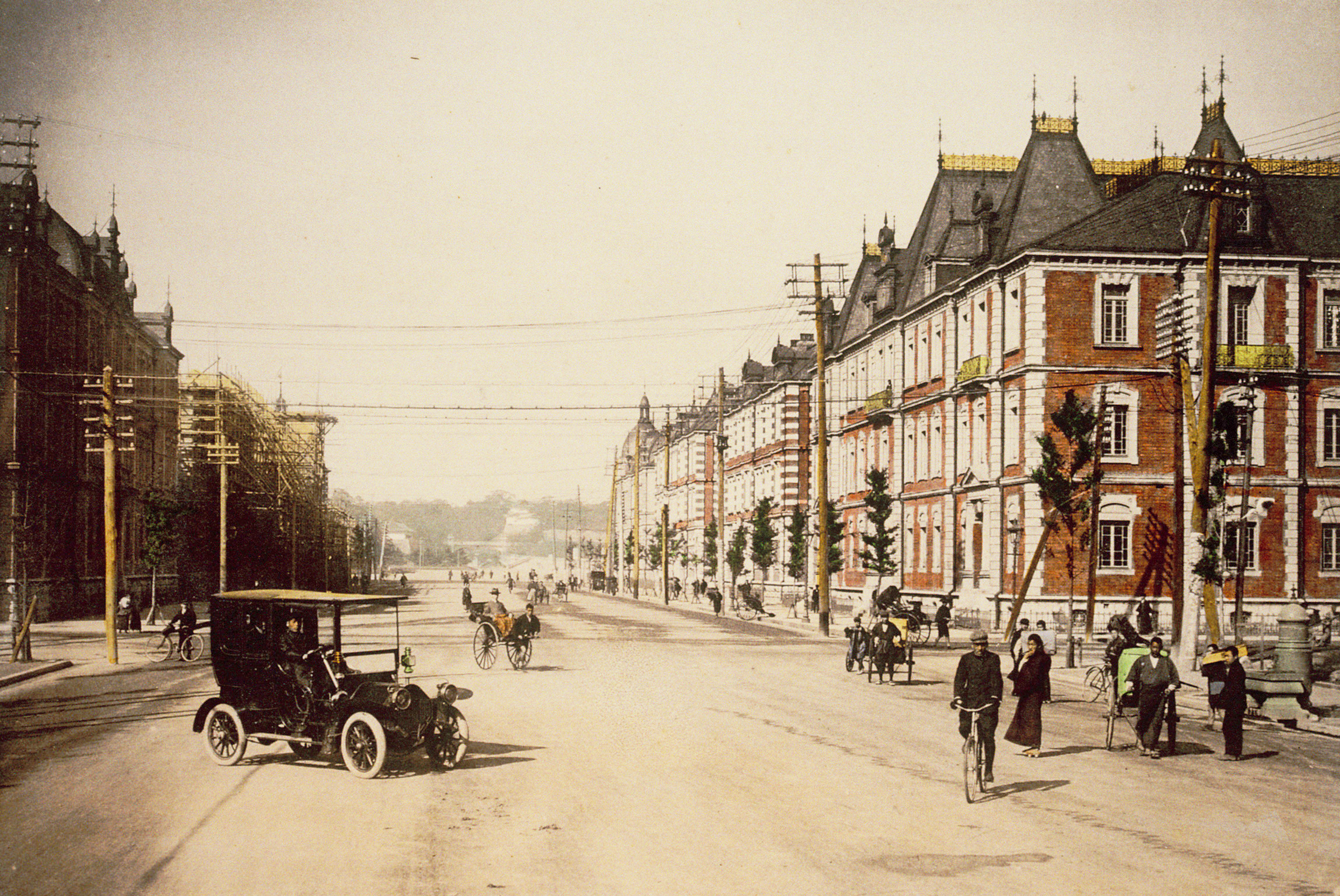
1920 photo with a view of the Mitsubishi headquarters in Marunouchi, looking towards the Imperial Palace

The postwar era brought Japan unprecedented prosperity. Japan went to the 1919 Paris Peace Conference as one of the great military and industrial powers of the world and received official recognition as one of the "Big Five" nations of the new international order. Tokyo was granted a permanent seat on the Council of the League of Nations and the peace treaty confirmed the transfer to Japan of Germany's rights in Shandong, a provision that led to anti-Japanese riots and a mass political movement throughout China. Similarly, Germany's former north Pacific islands were put under a Japanese mandate. Japan was also involved in the post-war Allied intervention in Russia and was the last Allied power to withdraw (doing so in 1925). Despite its small role in World War I and the Western powers' rejection of its bid for a racial equality clause in the peace treaty, Japan emerged as a major actor in international politics at the close of the war.

In 1918, Hara Takashi, a protégé of Saionji and a major influence in the prewar Seiyūkai cabinets, became the first commoner to serve as prime minister. He took advantage of long-standing relationships he had throughout the government, won the support of the surviving genrō and the House of Peers, and brought into his cabinet as army minister Tanaka Giichi, who had a greater appreciation of favorable civil-military relations than his predecessors. Nevertheless, major problems confronted Hara: inflation, the need to adjust the Japanese economy to postwar circumstances, the influx of foreign ideas, and an emerging labor movement. Prewar solutions were applied by the cabinet to these postwar problems, and little was done to reform the government. Hara worked to ensure a Seiyūkai majority through time-tested methods, such as new election laws and electoral redistricting, and embarked on major government-funded public works programs.

The public grew disillusioned with the growing national debt and the new election laws, which retained the old minimum tax qualifications for voters. Calls were raised for universal suffrage and the dismantling of the old political party network. Students, university professors, and journalists, bolstered by labor unions and inspired by a variety of democratic, socialist, communist, anarchist, and other Western schools of thought, mounted large but orderly public demonstrations in favor of universal male suffrage in 1919 and 1920. New elections brought still another Seiyūkai majority, but barely so. In the political climate of the day, there was a proliferation of new parties, including socialist and communist parties.

In the midst of this political ferment, Hara was assassinated by a disenchanted railroad worker in 1921. Hara was followed by a succession of nonparty prime ministers and coalition cabinets. Fear of a broader electorate, left-wing power, and the growing social change engendered by the influx of Western popular culture together led to the passage of the Peace Preservation Law in 1925, which forbade any change in the political structure or the abolition of private property.

In 1921, during the Interwar period, Japan developed and launched the Hōshō, which was the first purpose-designed aircraft carrier in the world. (Note: HMS Argus pre-dated Hōshō and had a long landing deck, but was designed and initially built as an ocean liner. The first purpose-designed aircraft carrier to be laid down was HMS Hermes in 1918 but she was completed after Hōshō.) Japan subsequently developed a fleet of aircraft carriers that was second to none.

The 1923 Great Kantō Earthquake in September 1923 was a major turning point that significantly altered the trajectory of Japan's Taishō democracy, shifting it from a period of democratic, liberalizing reform toward authoritarianism, social control, and military influence. In the chaotic aftermath, the government declared martial law, allowing the military to take a greater role in public affairs. This was used to suppress leftist, socialist, and communist movements, as well as to curb social unrest.

Unstable coalitions and divisiveness in the Diet led the Kenseikai (憲政会, Constitutional Government Association) and the Seiyū Hontō (政友本党, True Seiyūkai) to merge as the liberal Rikken Minseitō (立憲民政党, Constitutional Democratic Party) in 1927. The Rikken Minseitō platform was committed to the parliamentary system, democratic politics, and world peace. Thereafter, until 1932, the Seiyūkai and the Rikken Minseitō alternated in power.The two-party system during this period is called "Established practices in constitutional politics(憲政の常道, Kensei no Jodo)".

Despite the political realignments and hope for more orderly government, domestic economic crises plagued whichever party held power. Fiscal austerity programs and appeals for public support of such conservative government policies as the Peace Preservation Law—including reminders of the moral obligation to make sacrifices for the emperor and the state—were attempted as solutions. While the impact of the American panic of October 1929 was still reverberating throughout the world, the Japanese government lifted the gold embargo at the old parity in January 1930. These two blows struck the Japanese economy simultaneously, and the country was plunged into a severe depression. There was a sense of rising discontent that was heightened with the assault upon Rikken Minseitō prime minister Osachi Hamaguchi in 1930. Though Hamaguchi survived the attack and tried to continue in office despite the severity of his wounds, he was forced to resign the following year and died not long afterwards.

== Japanese response to communism and socialism ==
The Russian Revolution in 1917 led to the establishment of the Communist International (Comintern). The Comintern realized the importance of Japan in achieving successful revolution in East Asia and actively worked to form the Japanese Communist Party, which was founded in July 1922. The announced goals of the Japanese Communist Party in 1923 included the unification of the working class as well as farmers, recognition of the Soviet Union, and withdrawal of Japanese troops from Siberia, Sakhalin, China, Korea, and Taiwan. In the coming years, authorities tried to suppress the party, especially after the Toranomon Incident when a radical student under the influence of Japanese Marxist thinkers tried to assassinate Prince Regent Hirohito. The 1925 Peace Preservation Law was a direct response to the perceived "dangerous thoughts" perpetrated by communist and socialist elements in Japan.

The liberalization of election laws with the General Election Law in 1925 benefited communist candidates, even though the Japan Communist Party itself was banned. A new Peace Preservation Law in 1928, however, further impeded communist efforts by banning the parties they had infiltrated. The police apparatus of the day was ubiquitous and quite thorough in attempting to control the socialist movement. By 1926, the Japan Communist Party had been forced underground, by the summer of 1929 the party leadership had been virtually destroyed, and by 1933 the party had largely disintegrated.

Pan-Asianism was characteristic of right-wing politics and conservative militarism since the inception of the Meiji Restoration, contributing greatly to the pro-war politics of the 1870s. Disenchanted former samurai had established patriotic societies and shadow intelligence-gathering organizations, such as the Gen'yōsha (玄洋社, "Black Ocean Society"; founded in 1881) and its later offshoot, the Kokuryūkai (黒竜会, "Black Dragon Society" or "Amur River Society"; founded in 1901). These groups became active in domestic and foreign politics, helped foment pro-war sentiments, and supported ultra-nationalist causes through the end of World War II. After Japan's victories over China and Russia, the ultra-nationalists concentrated on domestic issues and perceived domestic threats such as socialism and communism.

== Taishō foreign policy ==
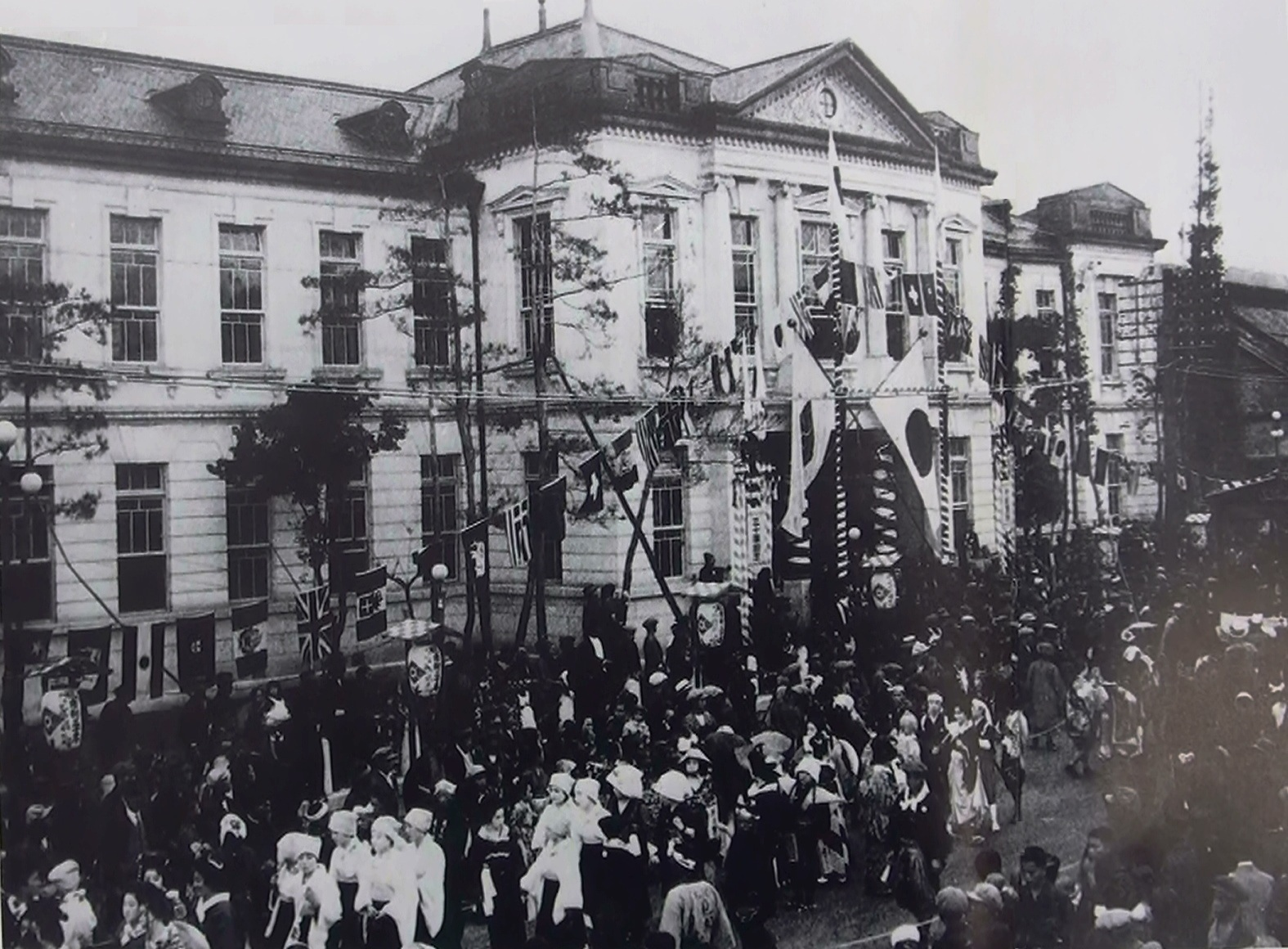
Kōfu city hall in 1918 (Taishō 7)

Emerging Chinese nationalism, the Russian Revolution, and the growing presence of the United States in East Asia all worked against Japan's postwar foreign policy interests. The four-year Siberian expedition and activities in China, combined with big domestic spending programs, had depleted Japan's wartime earnings. Only through more competitive business practices, supported by further economic development and industrial modernization, all accommodated by the growth of the zaibatsu, could Japan hope to become dominant in Asia. The United States, long a source of many imported goods and loans needed for development, was seen as becoming a major impediment to this goal because of its policies of containing Japanese imperialism.

An international turning point in military diplomacy was the Washington Naval Conference of 1921–1922, which produced a series of agreements that effected a new order in the Pacific region. The treaty, which set a 5:5:3 capital ship ratio for the United States, Britain, and Japan respectively, allowed Japan to cut astronomical military costs. Japan's economic problems made a naval buildup nearly impossible and, realizing the need to compete with the United States on an economic rather than a military basis, rapprochement became inevitable. Japan also adopted a more neutral attitude toward the civil war in China, dropped efforts to expand its hegemony into China proper, and joined the United States, Britain, and France in encouraging Chinese self-development.

In the Four-Power Treaty on Insular Possessions signed on December 13, 1921, Japan, the United States, Britain, and France agreed to recognize the status quo in the Pacific, and Japan and Britain agreed to formally terminate the Anglo-Japanese Alliance. The Washington Naval Treaty, signed on February 6, 1922, established an international capital ship ratio for the United States, Britain, Japan, France, and Italy (5, 5, 3, 1.75, and 1.75, respectively) and limited the size and armaments of capital ships already built or under construction. In a move that gave the Japanese Imperial Navy greater freedom in the Pacific Ocean, Washington and London agreed not to build any new military bases between Singapore and Hawaii.

The goal of the Nine-Power Treaty also signed on February 6, 1922, by Belgium, China, the Netherlands, and Portugal, along with the original five powers, was to prevent a war in the Pacific. The signatories agreed to respect China's independence and integrity, not to interfere in Chinese attempts to establish a stable government, to refrain from seeking special privileges in China or threatening the positions of other nations there, to support a policy of equal opportunity for commerce and industry of all nations in China, and to reexamine extraterritoriality and tariff autonomy. Japan also agreed to withdraw its troops from Shandong, relinquishing all but purely economic rights there, and to evacuate its troops from Siberia.

== End of the Taishō Democracy ==
Overall, during the 1920s, Japan changed its direction toward a democratic system of government. However, parliamentary government was not rooted deeply enough to withstand the economic and political pressures of the 1930s, during which military leaders became increasingly influential. These shifts in power were made possible by the ambiguity and imprecision of the Meiji Constitution, particularly regarding the position of the Emperor in relation to the constitution.

The final blow came in 1931, when the army's unauthorized invasion of Manchuria marked the end of civilian control, as the government proved incapable of reining in the military, leading directly to a de facto emperor-oriented fascist military dictatorship.

== Timeline ==
- 1912: The Crown Prince Yoshihito assumes the throne because of his father, Emperor Meiji's death (July 30). General Katsura Tarō becomes prime minister for a third term (May 26).
- 1913: Katsura is forced to resign, and Admiral Yamamoto Gonnohyōe becomes prime minister (February 20).
- 1914: Ōkuma Shigenobu becomes prime minister for a second term (April 16). Japan declares war on German Empire, joining the Allies side of World War I (August 23).
- 1915: Japan sends the Twenty-One Demands to China (January 18).
- 1916: Terauchi Masatake becomes prime minister (October 9).
- 1917: Lansing–Ishii Agreement goes into effect (November 2). Kogyo Shoyuken Senji Ho, the Wartime Law on Industrial Property, is enacted.
- 1918-20: Spanish flu pandemic began to devastate Japan, which killed 400,000 people.
- 1918: Siberian intervention launched (July). Hara Takashi becomes prime minister (September 29).
- 1919: March 1st Movement begins against Japanese colonial rule in Korea (March 1).
- 1920: Japan helps found the League of Nations.
- 1921: Prime Minister Hara is assassinated and he is succeeded by Takahashi Korekiyo (November 4). Crown Prince Hirohito becomes regent because his father, Emperor Taishō has an illness (November 29). Four-Power Treaty is signed (December 13).
- 1922: Five Power Naval Disarmament Treaty is signed (February 6). Admiral Katō Tomosaburō becomes prime minister (June 12). Japan withdraws troops from Siberia (August 28).
- 1923: The Great Kantō earthquake devastates Tokyo (September 1). Yamamoto becomes prime minister for a second term (September 2).
- 1924: Kiyoura Keigo becomes prime minister (January 7). Crown Prince Hirohito (the future Emperor Shōwa) marries Princess Nagako of Kuni (the future Empress Kōjun) (January 26). Katō Takaaki becomes prime minister (June 11).
- 1925: General Election Law was passed, all men above age 25 gained the right to vote (May 5). Besides, Peace Preservation Law is passed. Hirohito's first issue, Shigeko, Princess Teru is born (December 9).
- 1926: Wakatsuki Reijirō becomes prime minister (30 January). Emperor Taishō dies; He is succeeded by his eldest son, Crown Prince Hirohito (December 25).

== Equivalent calendars ==
By coincidence, Taishō year numbering is identical to that of the Republic of China calendar, and the Juche calendar of North Korea.

== Conversion table ==
To convert any Gregorian calendar year between 1912 and 1926 to Japanese calendar year in Taishō era, subtract 1911 from the year in question.

Taishō	1	2	3	4	5	6	7	8	9	10	11	12	13	14	15
Taishō	I	II	III	IV	V	VI	VII	VIII	IX	X	XI	XII	XIII	XIV	XV
AD	1912	1913	1914	1915	1916	1917	1918	1919	1920	1921	1922	1923	1924	1925	1926
AD	MCMXII	MCMXIII	MCMXIV	MCMXV	MCMXVI	MCMXVII	MCMXVIII	MCMXIX	MCMXX	MCMXXI	MCMXXII	MCMXXIII	MCMXXIV	MCMXXV	MCMXXVI

== See also ==
- Taishō Roman

== Bibliography ==
- Benesch, Oleg (December 2018). "Castles and the Militarisation of Urban Society in Imperial Japan" (PDF). Transactions of the Royal Historical Society. 28: 107–134. doi:10.1017/S0080440118000063. ISSN 0080-4401. S2CID 158403519.
- Bowman, John Stewart (2000). Columbia Chronologies of Asian History and Culture. New York: Columbia University Press. ISBN 9780231500043.
- Dickinson, Frederick R. War and National Reinvention: Japan in the Great War, 1914–1919 (Harvard Univ Asia Center, 1999).
- Duus, Peter, ed. The Cambridge History of Japan: The Twentieth Century (Cambridge University Press, 1989).
- Nussbaum, Louis-Frédéric; Roth, Käthe (2005), Japan Encyclopedia, Cambridge: Harvard University Press, ISBN 978-0-674-01753-5, OCLC 58053128. Louis-Frédéric is a pseudonym of Louis-Frédéric Nussbaum, see Authority File, Deutsche Nationalbibliothek.
- Strachan, Hew. The First World War: Volume I: To Arms (Oxford University Press, 2003) 455–94.
- Takeuchi, Tatsuji (1935). War and Diplomacy in the Japanese Empire online free
- Vogel, Ezra F. (2019). China and Japan: Facing History excerpt

Attribution

Preceded by Meiji (明治)	Era of Japan; Taishō (大正); 30 July 1912 – 25 December 1926	Succeeded by Shōwa (昭和)
