= Saionji Kinmochi =

Prime Minister of Japan (1906–1908, 1911–1912)

Prince Saionji Kinmochi
- 西園寺 公望
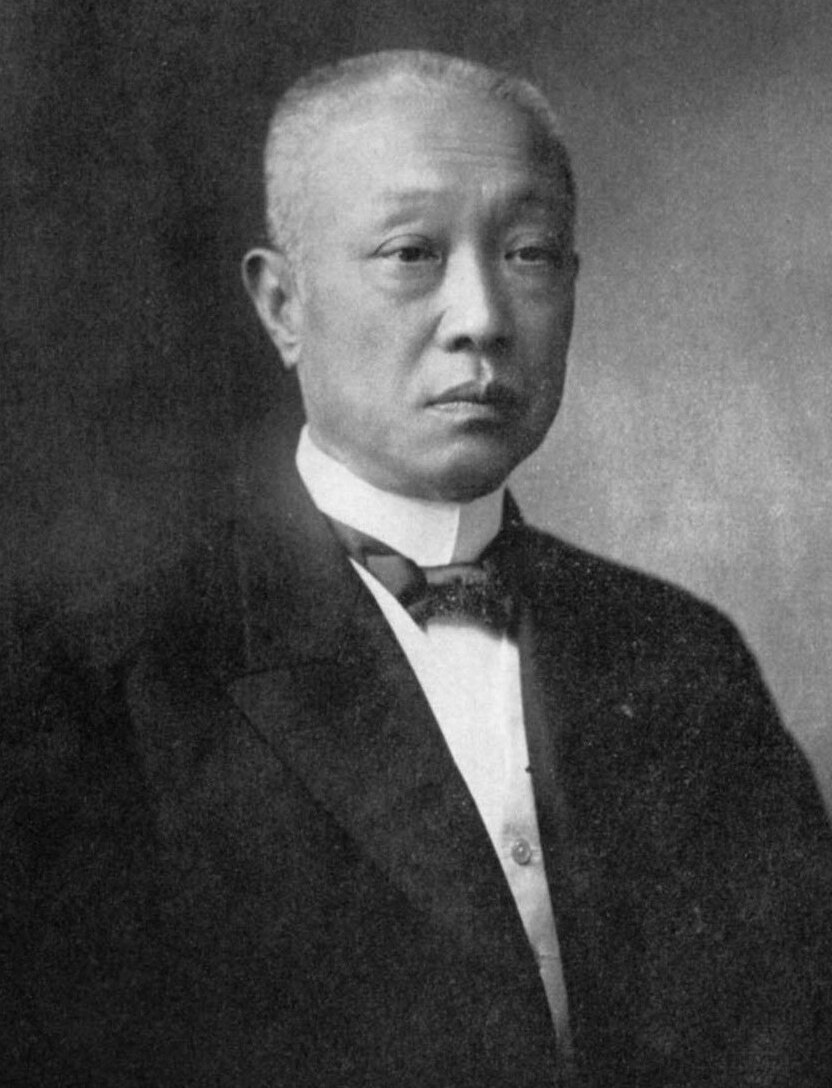
- Saionji c. 1913

Prime Minister of Japan
- In office 30 August 1911 – 21 December 1912
- Monarchs: Meiji; Taishō
- Preceded by: Katsura Tarō
- Succeeded by: Katsura Tarō
- In office 7 January 1906 – 14 July 1908
- Monarch: Meiji
- Preceded by: Katsura Tarō
- Succeeded by: Katsura Tarō

Acting Prime Minister of Japan
- In office 10 May 1901 – 2 June 1901
- Monarch: Meiji
- Preceded by: Itō Hirobumi
- Succeeded by: Katsura Tarō

President of the Rikken Seiyūkai
- In office 14 July 1903 – 18 June 1914
- Preceded by: Itō Hirobumi
- Succeeded by: Hara Takashi
Ministerial offices
Minister for Foreign Affairs
In office 3 March 1906 – 19 May 1906
Prime Minister	Himself
Preceded by	Katō Takaaki
Succeeded by	Hayashi Tadasu
In office 30 May 1896 – 22 September 1896
Prime Minister	Itō Hirobumi; Matsukata Masayoshi
Preceded by	Mutsu Munemitsu
Succeeded by	Ōkuma Shigenobu
Minister of Education
In office 12 January 1898 – 30 April 1898
Prime Minister	Itō Hirobumi
Preceded by	Hamao Arata
Succeeded by	Toyama Masakazu
In office 3 October 1894 – 28 September 1896
Prime Minister	Itō Hirobumi; Matsukata Masayoshi
Preceded by	Inoue Kowashi; Yoshikawa Akimasa (acting)
Succeeded by	Hachisuka Mochiaki
Additional positions
President of the Privy Council
In office 27 August 1900 – 13 July 1903
Monarch	Meiji
Vice President	Higashikuze Michitomi
Preceded by	Kuroda Kiyotaka
Succeeded by	Itō Hirobumi
Vice President of the House of Peers
In office 13 November 1893 – 12 May 1894
President	Hachisuka Mochiaki
Preceded by	Hosokawa Junjirō
Succeeded by	Nagashige Kuroda

Member of the House of Peers
- In office February 1890 – 24 November 1940 Hereditary peerage

Member of the Privy Council
- In office 10 May 1894 – 3 October 1894
- Monarch: Meiji

Personal details
- Born: Tokudaiji Yoshimaru; 7 December 1849 Kyoto, Yamashiro, Japan
- Died: 24 November 1940 (aged 90) Okitsu, Shizuoka, Japan
- Party: Rikken Seiyūkai
- Parents: Tokudaiji Kin'ito (father); Suehiro Ayako (mother)
- Relatives: Tokudaiji family Saionji family (by adoption)
- Education: University of Paris
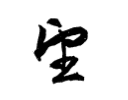
- Signature

Prince Saionji Kinmochi (Japanese: 西園寺 公望; 7 December 1849 – 24 November 1940) was a Japanese statesman and diplomat who twice served as Prime Minister of Japan, in 1906–1908 and 1911–1912. He was the last surviving member of the genrō, the small group of unofficial elder statesmen who dominated Japanese politics during the Meiji and Taishō periods. As a member of the Kyoto court nobility (kuge), Saionji forged a close relationship with the imperial house from a young age and participated in the Boshin War that overthrew the Tokugawa shogunate. He spent nearly a decade studying in France, where he became a heartfelt Francophile deeply influenced by European liberalism.

Upon his return to Japan, Saionji held a series of high-ranking posts in the Meiji government, including diplomat and cabinet minister, often under the patronage of Itō Hirobumi. In 1903, he succeeded Itō as president of the Rikken Seiyūkai political party and entered into a political compromise with his rival, General Katsura Tarō. For the next decade, a period known as the Keien era, the two men alternated as prime minister, with Saionji leading cabinets from 1906 to 1908 and again from 1911 to 1912.

Following the Taishō political crisis of 1912–1913, Saionji was elevated to the rank of genrō. For the next quarter-century, he played a crucial role in Japanese politics, primarily through his power to recommend prime ministerial candidates to the Emperor. As the most liberal of the elders, he championed party-based governments during the 1920s, a period known as "Taishō democracy". He also led the Japanese delegation at the Paris Peace Conference in 1919, where he took a background role while securing territorial gains for Japan. As the sole surviving genrō from 1924, his power to restrain the growing influence of the military proved limited. With the rise of militarism in the 1930s, Saionji's influence waned, and he witnessed the collapse of the liberal, pro-Western political order he had spent his life building. He retired from politics in 1937 and died in 1940, a year before Japan's entry into the Second World War.

== Early life and career ==
Saionji Kinmochi was born in Kyoto on 7 December 1849, the second son of Tokudaiji Kin'ito, a high-ranking court noble (kuge). His birth name was Yoshimaru; his birth year was deliberately misreported as 1847 to qualify him for certain court sinecures. In 1851, he was adopted by the head of another noble family, Saionji Morosue. Both the Tokudaiji and Saionji families were branches of the powerful Fujiwara clan and had a long history of service to the Imperial Court. From a young age, Saionji was immersed in court politics, being appointed Chamberlain at age four and becoming a playmate and companion of the prince who would become the Emperor Meiji. As a youth, he was known for his rebellious streak; he was reprimanded for practising with a sword, which was considered a brutish display by the Kyoto elite, and he read proscribed books. In 1867, Saionji actively pressed the court to join the armed struggle against the shogunate. During the ensuing Boshin War, the nineteen-year-old Saionji served as an imperial commander and governor, leading a force that achieved mostly bloodless surrenders against pro-shogunate forces and pacifying several regions in northern Japan.

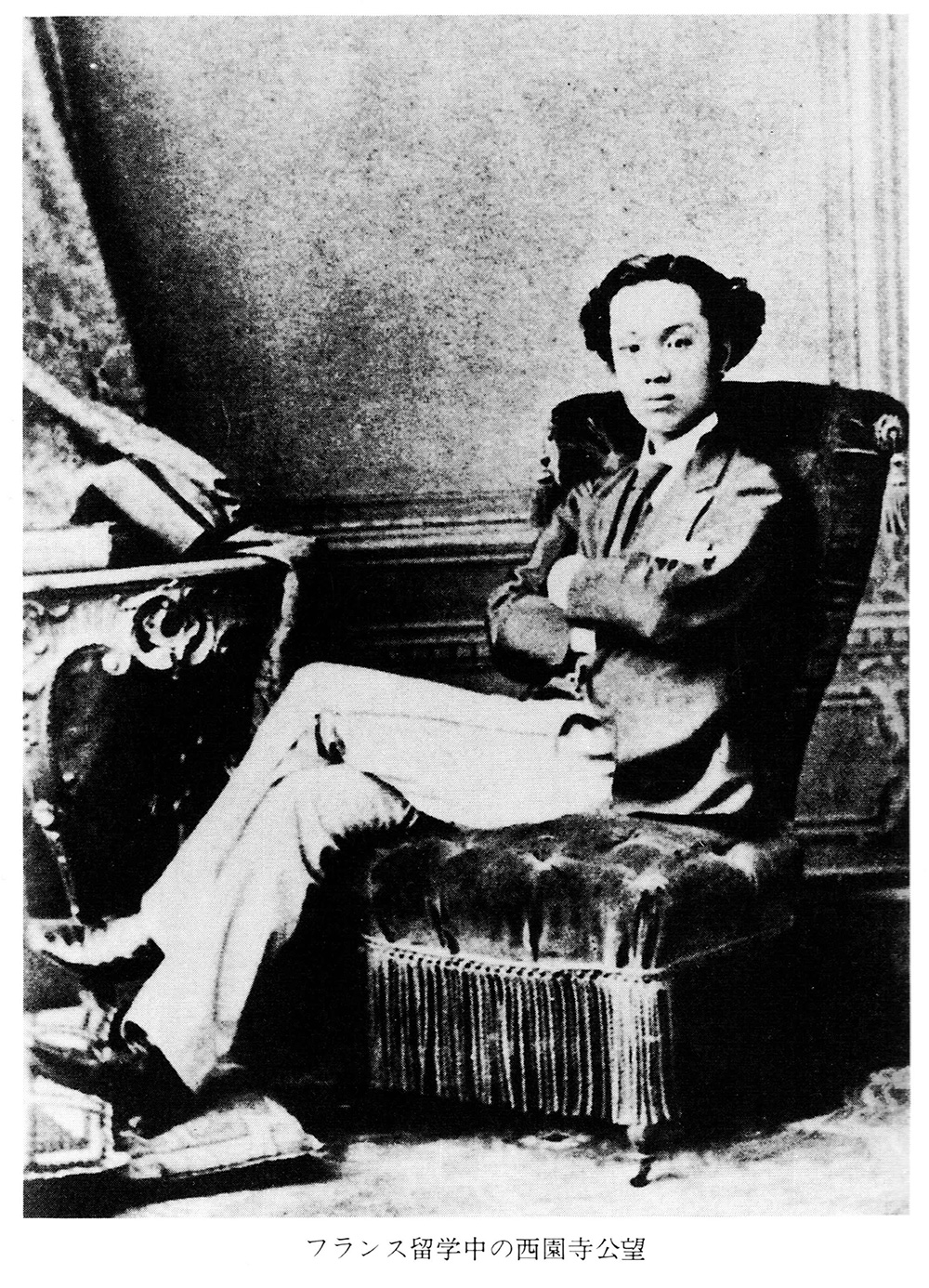
A young Saionji in Paris, 1870s

After the Meiji Restoration, Saionji briefly founded a private school, the Ritsumeikan, but it was quickly shut down by the authorities for harbouring "dangerous ideas". He resigned his post as governor of Echigo Province and departed for France in 1871, where he remained for nearly a decade. He arrived in Paris in the chaotic aftermath of the Paris Commune and studied law at the Sorbonne, where he was mentored by the radical legal theorist Émile Acollas. Through Acollas, he became acquainted with prominent political figures, including Georges Clemenceau. The experience deeply imbued him with the ideals of French liberalism and constitutionalism. As one of the few Japanese in Paris, he became an object of curiosity during the japonisme craze, befriending the author Judith Gautier, who based the character of "Prince Nagato" on him in her novel L'Usurpateur (1875). During the Satsuma Rebellion of 1877, Saionji worked at the Japanese legation to prevent the rebels from acquiring French-made arms.

Saionji returned to Japan in October 1880, at the age of thirty-two. The following spring, he co-founded the Tōyō Jiyū Shinbun (Oriental Free Press) newspaper with Nakae Chōmin to promote the growing Freedom and People's Rights Movement. However, the paper was almost immediately banned, and he was forced to resign under pressure from the Imperial Court, which disapproved of his radical political leanings. This move solidified his position within the government camp, and in November 1881 he was appointed a vice-councillor in the Sangiin, a government body tasked with drafting a constitution. In 1882, he accompanied Itō Hirobumi on an eighteen-month tour of Europe to study the constitutions of various nations, cementing a close political relationship with the future prime minister. Around 1884, Saionji's long-term geisha mistress, Okiku, gave birth to his daughter, Shinko. He was appointed to a series of diplomatic posts in Austria-Hungary (1885) and Germany and Belgium (1887) until returning to Japan in 1891.

In 1894, he joined Itō's second cabinet as Minister of Education. Saionji was a liberaliser, opposing the teaching of classical texts and religion in schools and advocating for the teaching of English. When Foreign Minister Mutsu Munemitsu fell ill in 1895, Saionji was appointed to serve concurrently as acting foreign minister. In this role, he was involved in the final negotiations of the Treaty of Shimonoseki ending the First Sino-Japanese War and the diplomatic crisis of the Triple Intervention, during which he officially became foreign minister in May 1896. The Itō cabinet resigned in August 1896, and Saionji later served as education minister again in Itō's third cabinet in 1898.

== President of the Seiyukai and Prime Minister ==
In 1900, Itō Hirobumi founded the Rikken Seiyūkai (Friends of Constitutional Government) political party. Saionji was one of its earliest members and took an active role in its planning. When Itō's fourth cabinet was formed in October 1900, Saionji was appointed president of the Privy Council. He served as acting prime minister on two occasions during the cabinet's tenure. The powerful Sumitomo zaibatsu (financial clique) was linked to the Seiyukai through Saionji's brother, Baron Sumitomo Kizaemon, who served as the conglomerate's president.

=== The Saionji–Katsura compromise ===
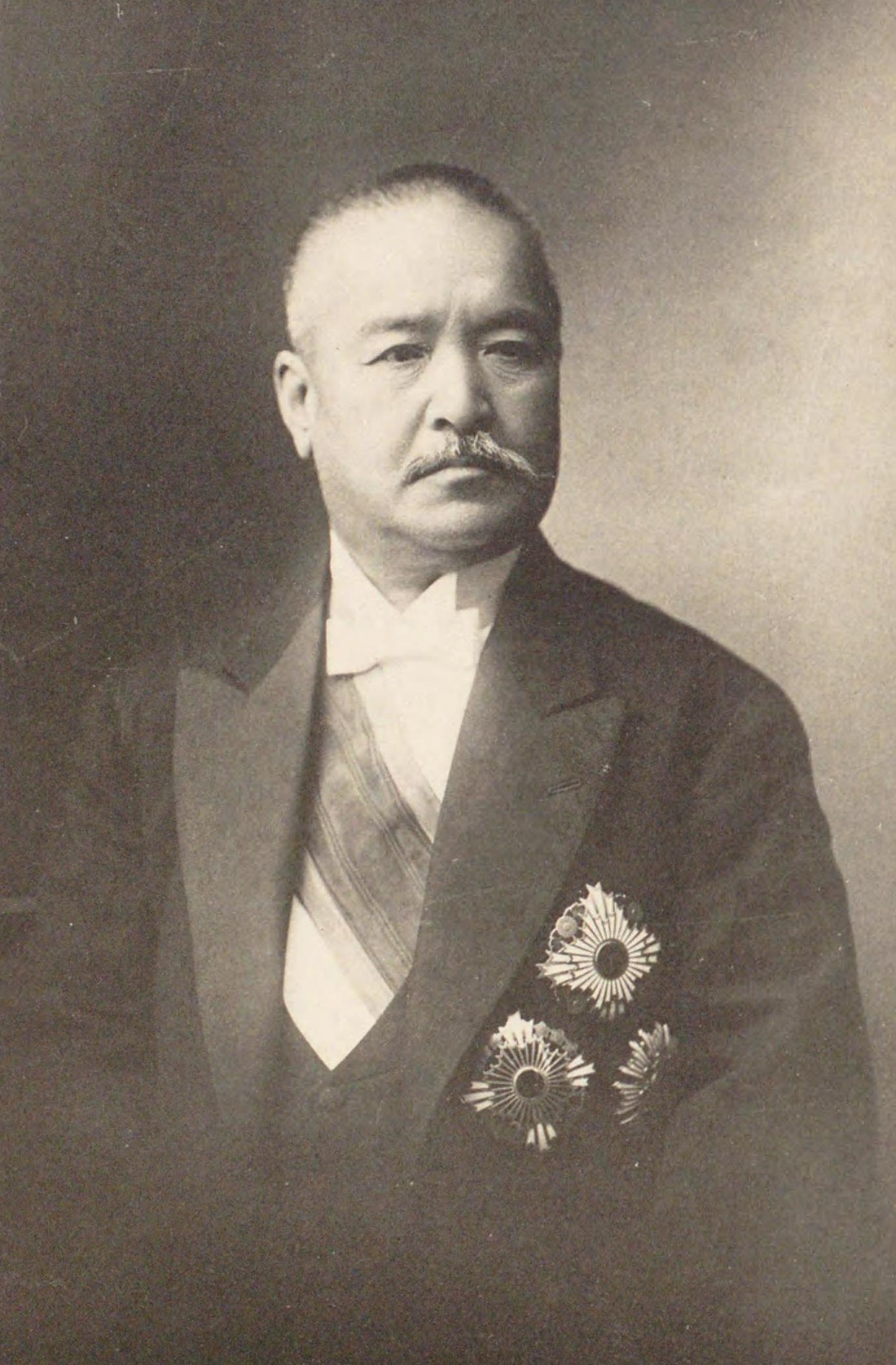
Katsura Tarō

In July 1903, amidst growing political tensions and dissatisfaction with his leadership, Itō resigned as president of the Seiyukai. He nominated Saionji as his successor. Saionji's appointment began a decade of relative political stability characterized by a compromise between the Seiyukai and the conservative bureaucracy. For the next ten years, Saionji and General Katsura Tarō, a protégé of the powerful oligarch Yamagata Aritomo, alternated as prime minister. This arrangement, known as the Keien era (桂園時代, after the alternate readings of the characters in their names), saw the Seiyukai's influence grow, while ensuring that key areas of decision-making, particularly in foreign policy and military affairs, remained under the control of the genrō. As party president, Saionji defined the role of the Seiyukai as a pro-government party that would support the cabinet in line with national policy, but would not interfere in areas such as diplomacy. He argued that political parties were a means to "eliminate the stratum between the Emperor and the People" and that Japan, like other civilized nations, was on a path of political progress that required a strong party system responsive to "enlightened popular will".

In December 1904, Katsura reached a secret understanding with Saionji and Hara Takashi that his government would be succeeded by a Saionji-led cabinet. This agreement came to fruition following the end of the Russo-Japanese War. In the face of widespread public dissatisfaction with the terms of the Treaty of Portsmouth, which led to the Hibiya riots, Katsura resigned. In January 1906, Saionji became prime minister, forming his first cabinet. His elevation marked a considerable step towards the recognition of political parties as a legitimate part of the governmental process.

=== First premiership (1906–1908) ===
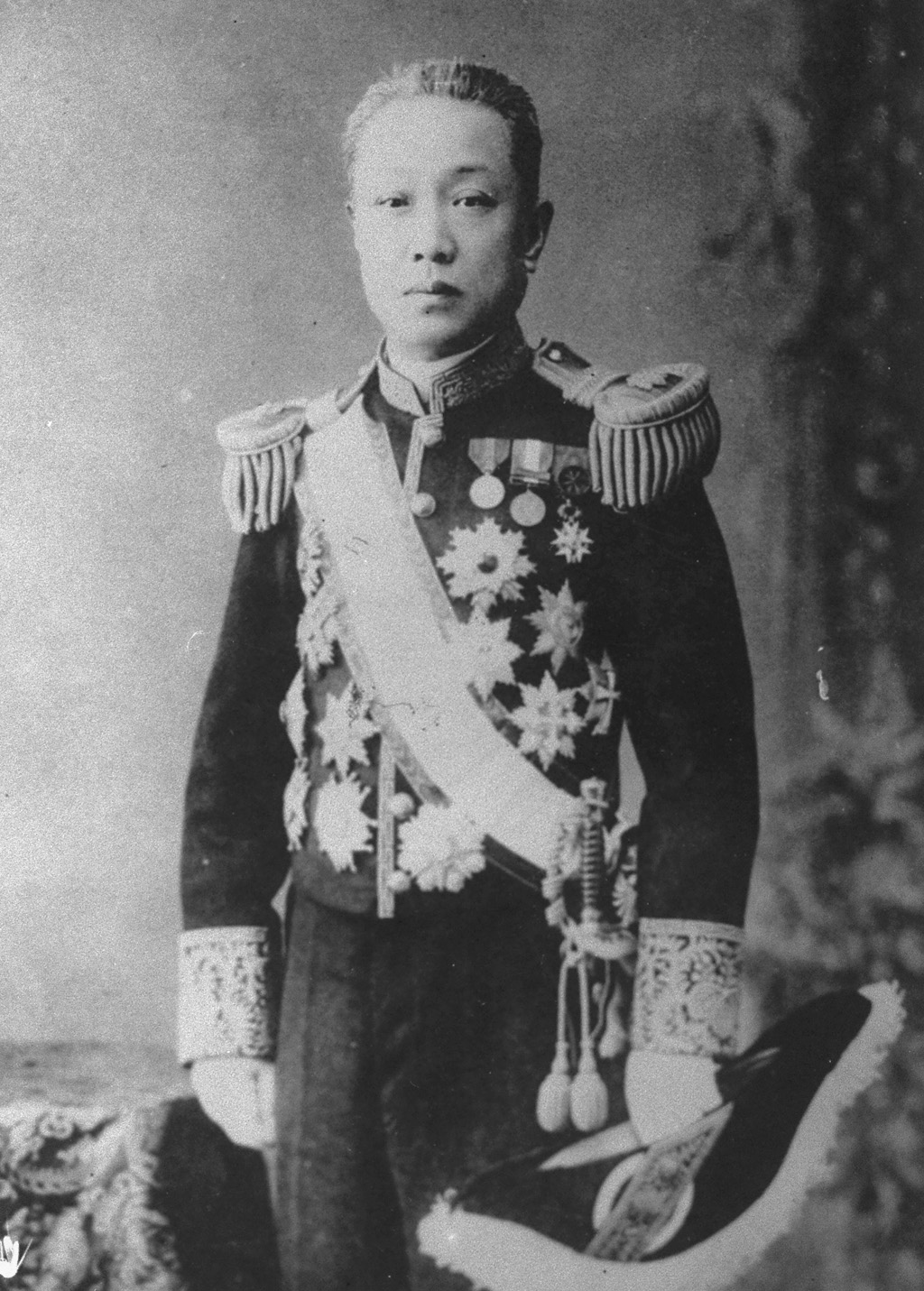
Saionji c. 1908

The first Saionji cabinet governed for two and a half years. The cabinet was formed through negotiations between Saionji, Katsura, and the individual genrō, and reflected a balance of elite interests. Key posts were held by representatives of the bureaucracy and military, but the Seiyukai made an important advance by securing the posts of Home Minister (held by Hara Takashi) and Justice Minister. The cabinet pursued policies that were largely a continuation of the previous administration but also reflected Saionji's own commitments. His government took a more relaxed attitude toward socialist activity, and in foreign policy, sought to limit military influence and improve relations with Western powers. Saionji visited Manchuria to investigate the possibility of withdrawing Japanese troops, and his cabinet worked to replace military administration with civilian officials. In Korea, the cabinet initially followed a "mild policy", but in July 1907, it forced the abdication of Emperor Gojong and signed a new agreement granting Japan wide-ranging powers over the Korean government. His cabinet also concluded the 1907 "Gentlemen's Agreement" with the United States to reduce Japanese immigration.

The government's policies, particularly Hara's efforts to expand the Seiyukai's influence within the bureaucracy, damaged relations with Katsura and the Yamagata faction. The cabinet's downfall was ultimately caused by economic turmoil and its inability to control military spending. The government's expansionist fiscal policies faced opposition from conservatives and the bureaucracy, while a post-war economic depression led to a surge in the price of rice and growing public discontent. Yamagata and other genrō rejected the government's budget, and in July 1908, Saionji resigned, recommending Katsura as his successor. Business opposition to the cabinet's fiscal and administrative policies also played a large part in its collapse. By acquiescing to the pressure, Saionji showed a deference to the elder statesmen that led some contemporaries to view him as being, by temperament, "as much an oligarch as a party man".

=== Second premiership (1911–1912) ===
The second Katsura cabinet governed for three years. During this time, the compromise between Katsura and the Seiyukai was maintained, largely through the close personal relationship between Katsura and Saionji. In August 1911, Katsura resigned, and Saionji formed his second cabinet. This cabinet was a significant break with precedent; it was formed after Katsura's recommendation to the Emperor but without a formal genrō conference, and Saionji, in a move to placate restive party members, selected his ministers almost entirely from within the Seiyukai, with minimal consultation with the genrō. This angered Yamagata and other conservatives, souring relations with the bureaucracy and military from the outset.

The cabinet's major political challenge came from the military. The army, backed by Yamagata, demanded funds for an expansion of two new divisions, a policy Saionji opposed on both economic grounds and for fear it would damage Japan's international relations. The issue became a major power struggle between the Seiyukai-led government and the military-bureaucratic faction. When the cabinet refused the army's demands, the Army Minister, Uehara Yūsaku, resigned. The army then refused to appoint a successor, a move which constitutionally forced the collapse of the government. Saionji resigned on 5 December 1912. The fall of his cabinet, and the subsequent appointment of Katsura to a third term, sparked the Taishō political crisis, a period of intense popular protest against "clan government".

== Genrō (elder statesman) ==
Saionji was made a genrō by imperial command in December 1912, joining Yamagata Aritomo, Inoue Kaoru, Matsukata Masayoshi, and Ōyama Iwao. As the only member of the group from the court nobility (kuge), and the last man to be so appointed, his elevation was a direct result of the Taishō Crisis. It was intended to strengthen the position of the genrō by bringing a younger, more liberal figure into their ranks who could command the support of the political parties. As a genrō, Saionji's primary function was to advise the emperor on the selection of the prime minister. His influence, initially secondary to that of the more powerful Yamagata, grew steadily over time.

After the collapse of Katsura's third cabinet in February 1913, Saionji played a key role in the selection of Admiral Yamamoto Gonnohyōe as his successor, cementing an alliance between the Seiyukai and the navy-Satsuma faction. In June 1914, Saionji officially retired as president of the Seiyukai and withdrew from active politics, though he continued to exert considerable influence behind the scenes.

=== Paris Peace Conference (1919) ===
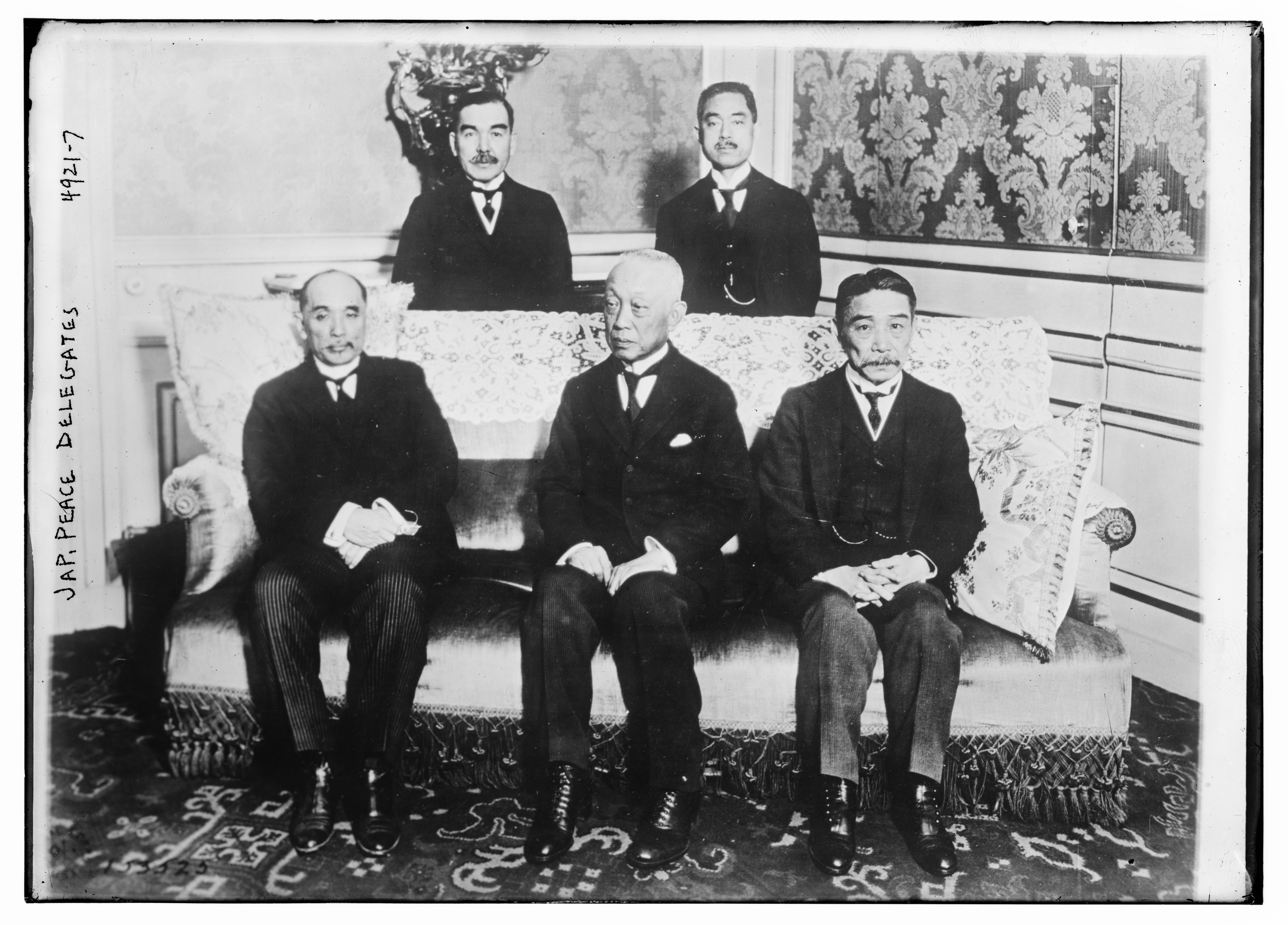
Saionji (centre) with the Japanese delegation to the Paris Peace Conference in 1919

In December 1918, Saionji was appointed chief plenipotentiary of the Japanese delegation to the Paris Peace Conference. His selection was based on his high public prestige, his internationalist reputation, and his personal connections with Western leaders, which were seen as crucial for navigating the complex post-war diplomatic environment. Saionji was a firm believer in international cooperation and a strong supporter of the newly formed League of Nations, a position that often put him at odds with more nationalist elements in the Japanese government. During this period, he also acted as a mentor to the young Prince Konoe Fumimaro, whom he had invited to join the delegation. Saionji was disconcerted, however, when Konoe published an essay critical of the emerging Anglo-American-led world order, and he privately warned his protégé to keep such views to himself.

In Paris, Saionji's role was largely that of a figurehead and mediator. While he did not participate directly in the main negotiations of the Council of Four (as he was not a head of state), he used his influence to guide the Japanese delegation, coordinate its positions, and defend its decisions against criticism from Tokyo. His two main objectives were to secure Japan's control over former German concessions in China's Shandong province and the Pacific, and to insert a Racial Equality Proposal into the Covenant of the League of Nations. The racial equality clause was defeated due to strong opposition from the British Dominions and the United States. In the face of a threatened Japanese walkout, U.S. President Woodrow Wilson ultimately conceded on the Shandong issue. Saionji used his long-standing friendship with French Prime Minister Georges Clemenceau to secure a favourable outcome for Japan. Despite instructions from Tokyo to make Japan's participation in the League conditional on these demands, Saionji was prepared to subordinate them to ensure Japan's entry into the new international order. His leadership at the conference cemented his reputation as a leading internationalist statesman and enhanced his prestige within the genrō.

=== Last of the genrō (1924–1932) ===
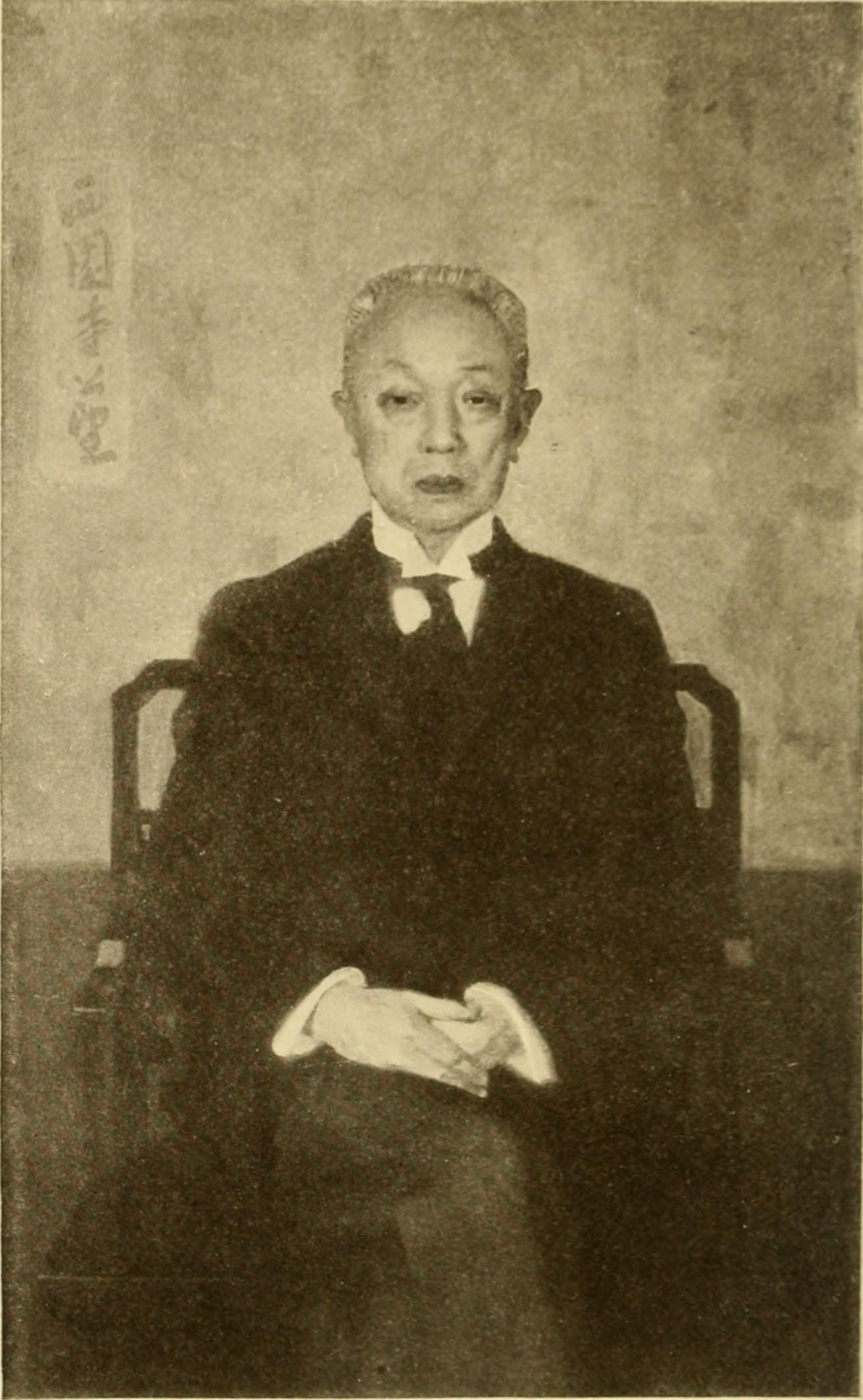
Saionji in 1921

The death of Yamagata in 1922 and Matsukata in 1924 left Saionji as the sole surviving genrō. During this period, his influence reached its zenith. He consolidated his power by securing the appointment of his liberal allies to key positions within the Imperial Court, effectively making the court a stronghold of the "Saionji group". This group, which included Makino Nobuaki, Ichiki Kitokurō, and Yuasa Kurahei, dominated the palace and advised the Emperor in line with Saionji's constitutional monarchist and internationalist principles. When Prime Minister Hara Takashi was assassinated in 1921, Saionji refused the premiership, which led to the appointment of Takahashi Korekiyo. After Takahashi's brief ministry fell, Saionji turned to Admiral Katō Tomosaburō and then to Admiral Yamamoto Gonnohyōe, in part because the major parties were in disarray and also because of his desire for a fair election.

From 1924 to 1932, Saionji oversaw a period of party-based government that he termed the "normal course of constitutional government" (憲政の常道, kensei no jōdō). He consistently recommended the leader of the majority party in the Diet as prime minister, beginning with the appointment of Katō Takaaki in 1924. While he often had misgivings about the abilities of the party leaders, as well as a personal distaste for Katō, he believed that this process was essential for the maturation of Japan's constitutional system. The foreign policy of this period, known as "Shidehara diplomacy" after Foreign Minister Shidehara Kijūrō, was closely aligned with Saionji's own views. It emphasized international cooperation, particularly with Britain and the United States, economic expansion over military intervention, and a policy of non-interference in China's domestic affairs.

=== Confronting militarism (1928–1936) ===
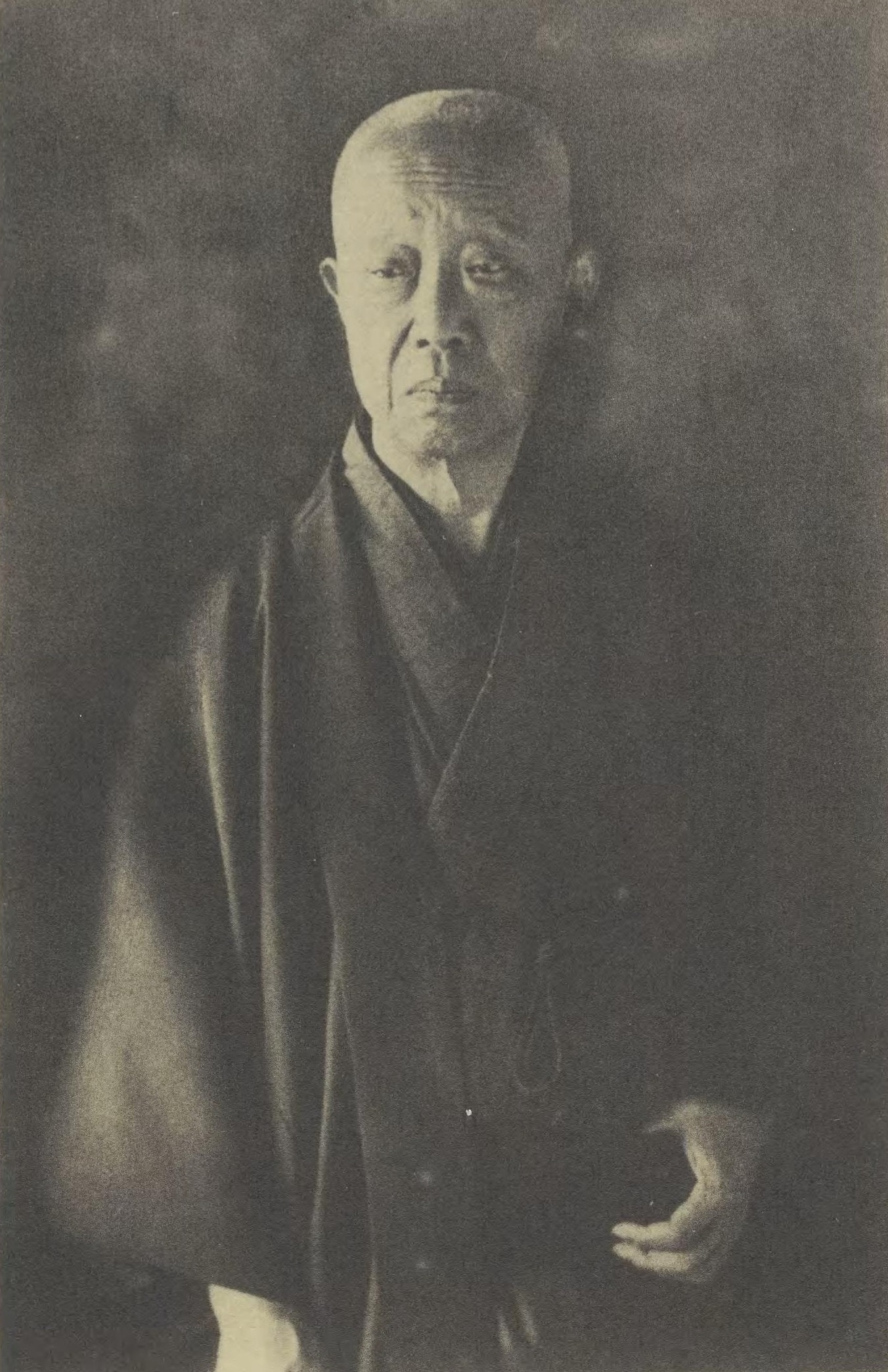
Saionji in 1929

The late 1920s and early 1930s saw the rise of militarism and a growing challenge to the liberal order Saionji represented. The assassination of the Manchurian warlord Zhang Zuolin by the Kwantung Army in 1928 marked a turning point. Saionji, outraged by the army's insubordination, insisted that Prime Minister Tanaka Giichi punish the responsible officers. When Tanaka failed to do so, Saionji orchestrated the downfall of his cabinet by having the Emperor express his displeasure, a rare and powerful use of imperial authority. Following Tanaka's fall, he recommended Hamaguchi Osachi as prime minister.

In 1930, Saionji and his allies faced another major challenge during the London Naval Treaty controversy. The government's decision to accept a compromise on naval ratios that was opposed by the Naval General Staff sparked a major political crisis. Saionji strongly supported the treaty, seeing it as essential for both Japan's economy and its relations with the West. He mobilised the "Saionji group" at court to support the government, and in a series of complex political manoeuvres, successfully overcame the opposition of the military and the Privy Council to secure the treaty's ratification.

The Mukden Incident in September 1931 and the subsequent military takeover of Manchuria presented Saionji with his gravest challenge yet. While he and the government attempted to contain the army's actions, they were ultimately unsuccessful. Unlike in the past, Saionji refused to use the Emperor's authority to directly confront the military. He believed that the army's actions had wide public support and that any attempt at imperial intervention would not only fail but would also damage the prestige of the throne and undermine the constitutional system itself, fearing for the preservation of the monarchy from military radicalism. This rationale guided his decision in the aftermath of the May 15 Incident in 1932, when Prime Minister Inukai Tsuyoshi was assassinated. Believing that no party leader could command the necessary national unity, and deeply distrustful of the Seiyukai's new, reactionary leader Suzuki Kisaburō, Saionji maneuvered for the creation of a "national unity" cabinet under Admiral Saitō Makoto. This decision effectively ended the era of party-led cabinets until after the Second World War. This decision marked a significant shift in his approach, reflecting his recognition that the balance of power had decisively shifted away from the liberal establishment.

The 1935 "Minobe organ theory controversy", a right-wing attack on the liberal constitutional theories of Minobe Tatsukichi, was another major blow. Saionji and the Emperor both supported Minobe, seeing the affair as a politically motivated attack on the constitutional monarchist system and the "Jushin" (senior statesmen) around the throne. However, the government was eventually forced to make concessions to the right-wing forces. The climax of this period of rising militarism came with the February 26 incident of 1936, a military coup attempt in which several of Saionji's closest allies, including Saitō Makoto and Takahashi Korekiyo, were assassinated. Saionji himself was a target, but was not attacked. The incident shattered the power of the liberal group and marked the effective end of Saionji's ability to influence the direction of Japanese politics.

== Final years and death (1937–1940) ==
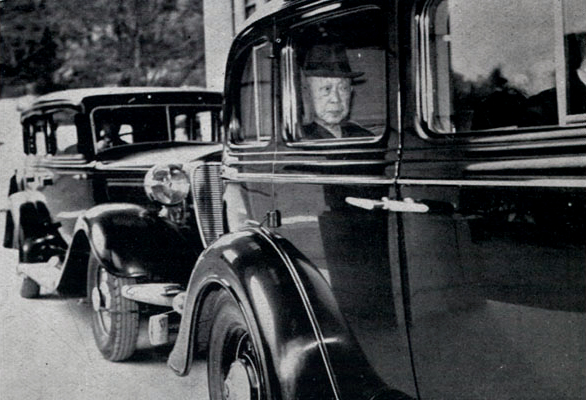
Saionji departing the Tokyo Imperial Palace in a car, 1936

After 1936, Saionji's role in politics became that of a "political commentator" rather than an active participant. His power to recommend prime ministers was formally transferred to the Lord Keeper of the Privy Seal in 1937, though he continued to be consulted on cabinet changes. His influence became negligible, and his recommendations were often ignored, as in the 1939 appointment of Hiranuma Kiichirō, a man he deeply opposed. In his final years, Saionji remained constantly hopeful of a revitalization of the party movement, privately protecting the parties as much as possible and showing his sympathies for their more anti-militarist elements.

Saionji's final years were dominated by his opposition to Japan's increasingly pro-Axis foreign policy. He was a bitter critic of the Anti-Comintern Pact and fought against the strengthening of the alliance with Germany and Italy, arguing that it was to Japan's great disadvantage and would alienate Britain and the United States. He was deeply troubled by the outbreak of the Second Sino-Japanese War in 1937, believing it would damage Japan's international standing and could have been avoided. He broke decisively with his former protégé, Konoe Fumimaro, over his handling of the war and his attempts to realign the court in a more right-wing direction. Saionji's last political battle was to preserve the liberal complexion of the Imperial Court as the "last bastion" of his political ideals. By 1940, with the signing of the Tripartite Pact, Saionji's political function had effectively ended. He died at his villa in Okitsu on 24 November 1940, at the age of 90 (91 by traditional East Asian reckoning).

== Legacy ==
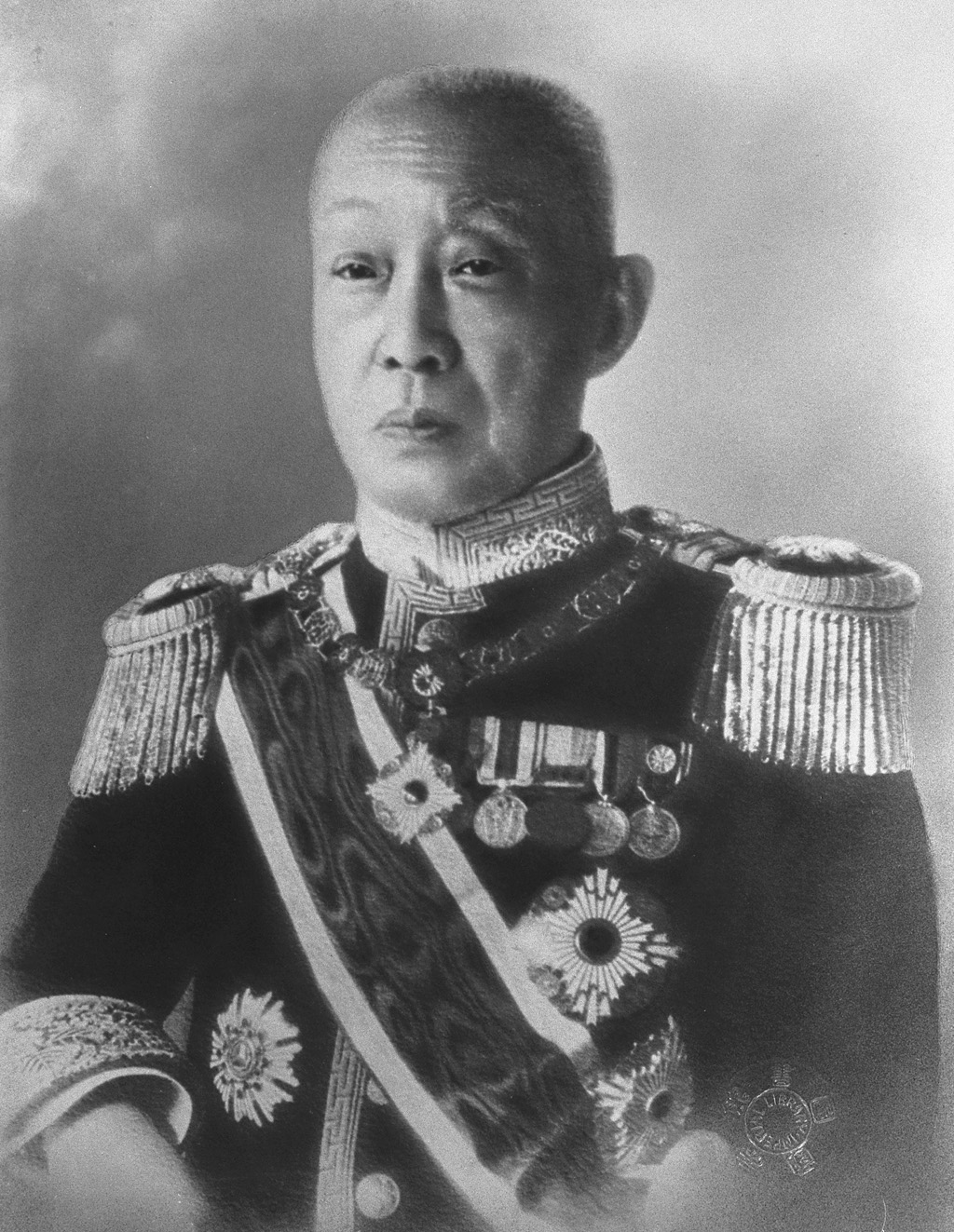
Saionji c. 1920s

Saionji Kinmochi's political philosophy was consistently liberal and internationalist. Formed during his early years in France, his core beliefs in constitutional monarchy, a government responsible to an educated public, and the integration of Japan into the Western international community remained constant throughout his life. As a practical politician, however, he was a pragmatist who understood the necessity of compromise. His career can be seen as a long effort to guide Japan towards his liberal ideals while navigating the political realities of his time.

For much of his career, Saionji served as a crucial conduit between competing elites—the court, the bureaucracy, the military, and the political parties. As a high-ranking aristocrat with impeccable court connections, he was able to bridge the gap between the old oligarchic order and the new forces of party politics. His leadership of the Seiyukai and his political compromise with Katsura were instrumental in the development of the party as an independent political force. He was also a powerful figurehead, lending his prestige to liberal and internationalist causes that might otherwise have lacked credibility.

As the last of the genrō, Saionji's influence was decisive in establishing the party-based governments of the 1920s. His refusal to use the power of the throne to oppose the rise of militarism in the 1930s has been a subject of debate among historians. While some have seen it as a failure of leadership, Lesley Connors argues that it was a reasoned decision based on his assessment that such an intervention would have failed and ultimately destroyed the constitutional monarchy he sought to preserve. Saionji's life spanned Japan's transformation from a feudal society to a modern world power. He was a central figure in that transformation, and his career reflects the rise and fall of liberal, internationalist politics in pre-war Japan. After his death, the extensive diaries of his secretary, Harada Kumao, became a key source for historians and were used as evidence in the International Military Tribunal for the Far East, where they helped to exonerate Emperor Hirohito and preserve the constitutional monarchy, Saionji's "enduring victory".

== Honours ==
From the corresponding article in the Japanese Wikipedia

=== Titles ===
- Marquess (7 July 1884)
- Genrō (21 December 1912)
- Prince (7 September 1920)

=== Japanese decorations ===
- Grand Cordon of the Order of the Sacred Treasure (21 June 1895)
- Grand Cordon of the Order of the Rising Sun with Paulownia Flowers (14 September 1907)
  - Grand Cordon of the Order of the Rising Sun (5 June 1896)
  - Second Class of the Order of the Rising Sun (29 May 1888)
  - Third Class of the Order of the Rising Sun (11 March 1882)
- Collar of the Order of the Chrysanthemum (10 November 1928)
  - Grand Cordon of the Order of the Chrysanthemum (21 December 1918)

=== Other decorations ===
- Knight Grand Cross of the Order of Pius IX (25 February 1888)
- Knight First Class of the Order of the Iron Crown (9 May 1888)
- Knight Grand Cross of the Order of the Netherlands Lion (16 March 1891)
- 1st Class of the Order of the Red Eagle (15 October 1891)
- First Class of the Order of the Medjidie (8 March 1894)
- Order of the White Eagle (17 March 1896)
- Grand Cross of the Order of Charles III (10 November 1896)
- Grand Cross of the Order of the Dannebrog (10 February 1898)
- Honorary Knight Grand Cross of the Order of St. Michael and St. George (GCMG) (20 February 1906)
- Grand Cross of the Legion of Honour (23 October 1907)
- Order of St. Alexander Nevsky (30 October 1907)

=== Order of precedence ===
- Junior First Rank (25 November 1940; posthumous)
- Senior second rank (20 December 1898)
- Second rank (11 December 1893)
- Senior third rank (19 December 1878; restored)
- Senior third rank (5 of 7th month 1862; relinquished 3rd of 7th 1869)
- Third rank (25 April 1861)
- Senior fourth rank, junior grade (5 February 1856)
- Fourth rank, senior grade (22 January 1855)
- Fourth rank, junior grade (22 January 1854)
- Senior fifth rank, junior grade (21 January 1853)
- Fifth rank, senior grade (27 December 1852)
- Fifth rank, junior grade (early 1852)

== Ancestry ==
Ancestors of Saionji Kinmochi

8. Takatsukasa Masahiro (1761–1841)
4. Takatsukasa Masamichi (1789–1868)
9. Hachisuka Noriko (1771–1795)
2. Tokudaiji Kin'ito (1821–1883)
10. Tokugawa Harutoshi, 7th daimyō of Mito (1773–1816)
5. Tokugawa Kiyoko (1796–1861)
11. Toyama
1. Prince Saionji Kinmochi (1849–1940)
3. Suehiro Ayako (1830–1903)

== See also ==
- List of Japanese ministers, envoys and ambassadors to Germany

Political offices
Preceded by Inoue Kowashi	Minister of Education; 1894–1896	Succeeded by Hachisuka Mochiaki
Preceded by Mutsu Munemitsu	Minister of Foreign Affairs; 1896	Succeeded by Ōkuma Shigenobu
Preceded by Itō Hirobumi	Prime Minister of Japan; Acting; 1901	Succeeded by Katsura Tarō
Preceded by Kuroda Kiyotaka	President of the Privy Council; 1900–1903	Succeeded by Itō Hirobumi
Preceded by Katsura Tarō	Prime Minister of Japan; 1906–1908	Succeeded by Katsura Tarō
Preceded by Katsura Tarō	Prime Minister of Japan; 1911–1912	Succeeded by Katsura Tarō
Party political offices
Preceded by Itō Hirobumi	President of the Rikken Seiyūkai; 1903–1914	Succeeded by Hara Takashi
Diplomatic posts
Preceded by Ueno Kagenori	Minister to Austria-Hungary; 1885–1887	Succeeded by Toda Ujitaka
Preceded by Shinagawa Yajirō	Minister to Germany; 1887–1891	Succeeded by Aoki Shūzō
