= Taishō political crisis =

1912–13 political upheaval in Japan

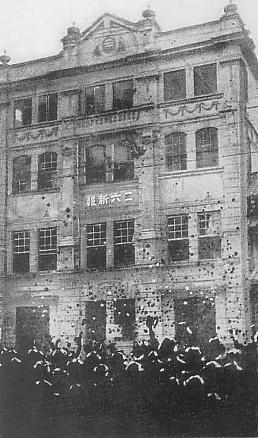
Mobs vandalizing pro-government Niroku Shimposha newspaper office

The Taishō political crisis (大正政変, Taishō seihen) was a period of political upheaval in Japan that occurred after the death of Emperor Meiji in 1912. During the twelve-month period following the emperor's death, the Japanese government was led by three different prime ministers as the government attempted to restore the balance between the influence of Japan's elder statesmen (the genrō) and that of the Japanese public, as embodied in the Meiji Constitution.

== Beginnings ==
Following the death of Emperor Meiji on July 30, 1912, Crown Prince Yoshihito ascended to the Chrysanthemum Throne. The final years of Emperor Meiji's reign had seen rising government expenditures, particularly for military expansion and overseas commitments, leaving strained public finances and limited reserves.

When Prime Minister Saionji Kinmochi, who had been appointed by Emperor Meiji and remained in office after his death, sought to restrain military spending, Army Minister Uehara Yūsaku resigned in protest over proposed reductions to the Army budget, particularly the cancellation of plans for two additional divisions. Since a 1900 imperial ordinance required that the Army Minister be an active-duty general, and the Army declined to nominate a successor, Saionji was unable to complete his cabinet. Lacking a War Minister, the cabinet could not legally function, and Saionji resigned on December 21, 1912.

Emperor Taishō then appointed Katsura Tarō, a former army general who had twice previously served as prime minister and was a leading member of the genrō, to form a new government. Katsura’s appointment proved controversial, as many political leaders and members of the public viewed it as a revival of oligarchic rule at the expense of party government. Soon after taking office, Katsura faced similar pressure from the Navy, which demanded increased funding for battleship construction. The Navy signaled that it might refuse to nominate a Navy Minister under the same active-duty requirement. In response, Katsura appealed directly to the emperor, who instructed the Navy to provide a minister, thereby preventing another cabinet crisis.

== Popular uprising ==
The opposition political parties (particularly the Rikken Seiyūkai and Rikken Kokumintō) saw that as proof of Katsura's lack of commitment to constitutional government, and they joined forces with journalists and businessmen to form the Movement to Protect Constitutional Government. Katsura responded by suspending the Diet on three occasions and by forming his own political party, the Rikken Dōshikai. Popular protest nevertheless spread, and on February 10, 1913, thousands of protesters rioted in Tokyo, threatening the Diet building, setting fire to police stations and vandalizing pro-government newspaper offices.

Support for Katsura in the Diet fell, and he lost a vote of no confidence, the first such occurrence in Japan. Katsura resigned on February 20, 1913, and was replaced by Yamamoto Gonnohyōe, a former navy admiral.
