= Tokudaiji Kin'ito =

Japanese court noble (1821–1883)

- 徳大寺 公純
- Born: Takatsukasa Sukekimi; December 22, 1821
- Died: November 5, 1883 (aged 61)
- Occupation: Kugyō

Tokudaiji Kin'ito (徳大寺 公純; 22 December 1821 – 5 November 1883) was a Japanese kugyō (court noble) during the Bakumatsu period.

== Life ==
Takatsukasa Sukekimi was born on 22 December 1821. His father was Takatsukasa Masamichi and his mother was a daughter of Zaihi Karahashi. He was also the adopted son of Tokudaiji Sanekata. Amongst his children were Tokudaiji Sanetsune, Saionji Kinmochi, Suehiro Takemaro and Sumitomo Tomoito.

In 1850, Kin'ito became dainagon. He was made a gisō in 1857. In 1858, Emperor Kōmei appointed Kin'ito and Ichijō Tadaka as his emissaries to the Ise Grand Shrine. After the signing of the Treaty of Amity and Commerce, Kin'ito was purged by Ii Naosuke during the Ansei Purge for fifty days because he opposed the rights of the treaty. However, he was forgiven after one month.

Kin'ito then promoted the kōbu gattai policy with Nijō Nariyuki and opposed the marriage between Princess Kazu and Tokugawa Iemochi, for which he resigned under pressure from the shogunate. After that, he returned home and became a minor official (shissei). His public duties were also being targeted in political fluctuations, and in 1863, his vassals were killed by rōnin who opposed the civil war.

After the Meiji Restoration, Tokudaiji remained in Kyoto. He died on November 5, 1883, at the age of 61.
