= War and Diplomacy in the Japanese Empire =

1935 book

- Title page for War and Diplomacy in the Japanese Empire (1935)
- Author: Tatsuji Takeuchi
- Genre: Non-fiction
- Publisher: Doubleday, Doran, and Company
- Publication date: 1935

War and Diplomacy in the Japanese Empire is a 1935 non-fiction book by Tatsuji Takeuchi, published by Doubleday, Doran, and Company. Quincy Wright did the introduction.

William L. Langer of Foreign Affairs described it as "a scholarly and thoroughly documented analysis of the Japanese constitutional system and of the technique of Japanese diplomacy."

Thomas Harrington in International Affairs stated that "a special study of the internal operations of the Government and of the motives and traditions which influence its activities."

== Background ==
In 1927 the Social Science Research Council at the University of Chicago started a series about why wars are started, and this book became a part of the series.

The author taught international relations at Kwansei Gakuin University. He wrote the body of his work in the University of Chicago, The author had access to multiple Japanese sources not yet available in the West, and the majority of the sources were Japanese. Quigley stated that the Japanese Diet had relatively little influence on foreign relations but the ability to get sources about that aspect meant it had more emphasis in the book.

Most of the book was written in 1931, but publication was delayed after the Mukden Incident. The author wrote his preface at Kwansei Gakuin on June 20, 1935.

== Content ==
The book covers the period up to 1933. The author did not intend to create a complete history of international relations between Japan and other countries. According to Takeuchi, "the substance of policy" is not the focus of the book, and instead "procedure" is the focus. Quigley stated that nevertheless the book contains valuable information regarding the former.

Part I discusses the structure of Japanese government agencies that engage in foreign relations; it has 780 pages. Part II includes eighteen case studies, each about a different diplomatic event, and discusses Japan's foreign affairs, including its end of participation in the League of Nations. Harold S. Quigley in Pacific Affairs described it as the "main" section of the book, and Ralph A. Norem of the University of California Los Angeles described it as "the main body of the book". Part III contains three chapters and includes Takeuchi's views of the foreign affairs processes by the Japanese government, based upon the content of Part II.

There is an appendix, a bibliography, and an index. The first one includes a copy of the Japanese constitution. The book contains footnotes, described by Quigley as "extensive", and which include information on Japanese government policy.

== Reception ==
The Spectator stated that while Japan had not reached a "totalitarian" environment yet, in light of the increasing militarization, "it seems strange that so independent a mind should be tolerated at all." It argued in regards to the content about the invasion of Manchuria that it is "a most valuable account".

Langer praised the sourcing and described it as "One of the most important books of the quarter."

Quigley wrote that stated "the work as a whole is entitled to the grateful attention of all students of international relations." Quigley added that "One feels that what is written is sincerely written."

G. Nye Steiger of Simmons College wrote that the author "succeeded in throwing a flood of much needed light" on the subject matter.
