= Genrō =

Japanese elder statesmen

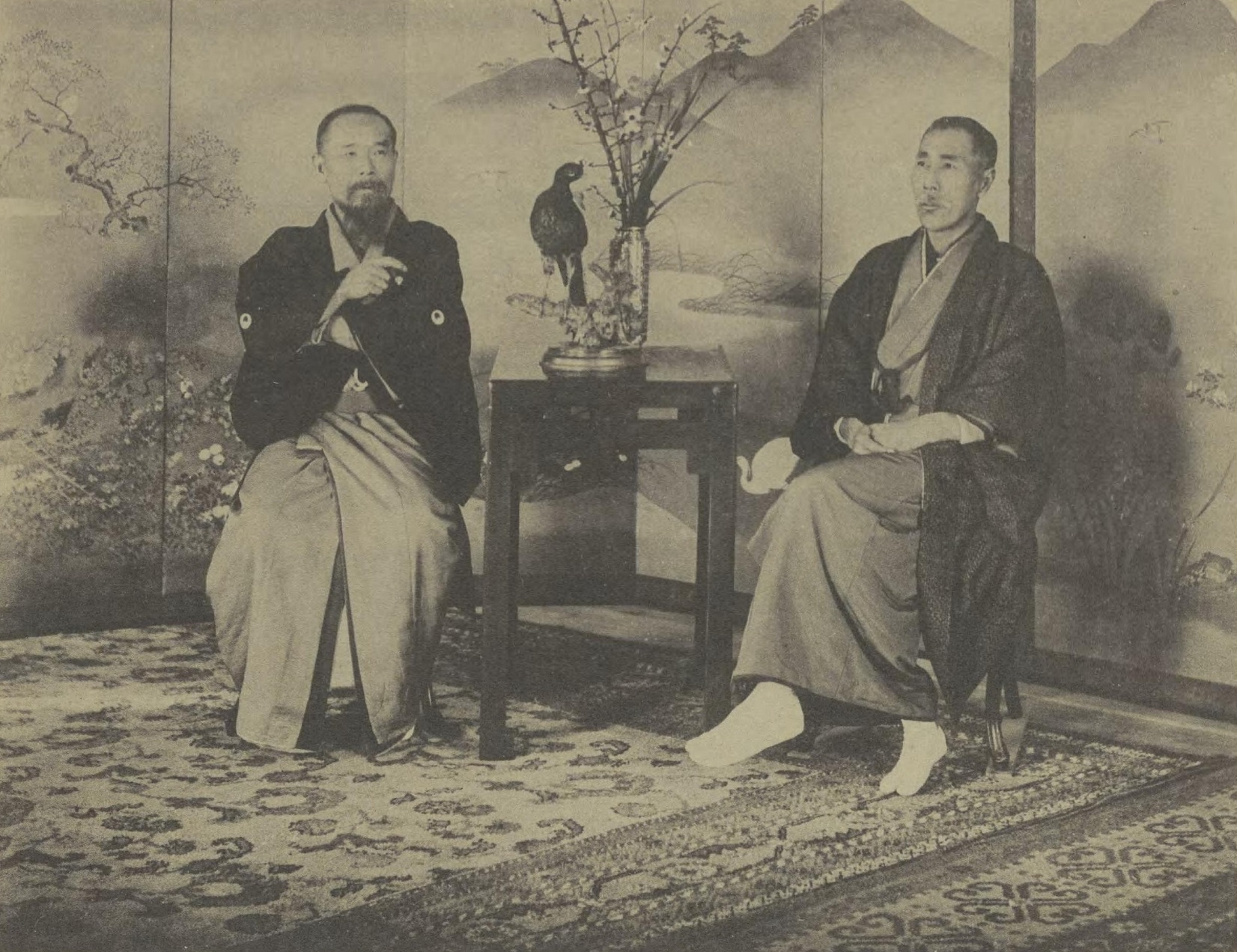
The leading genrō Ito Hirobumi and Yamagata Aritomo in 1896

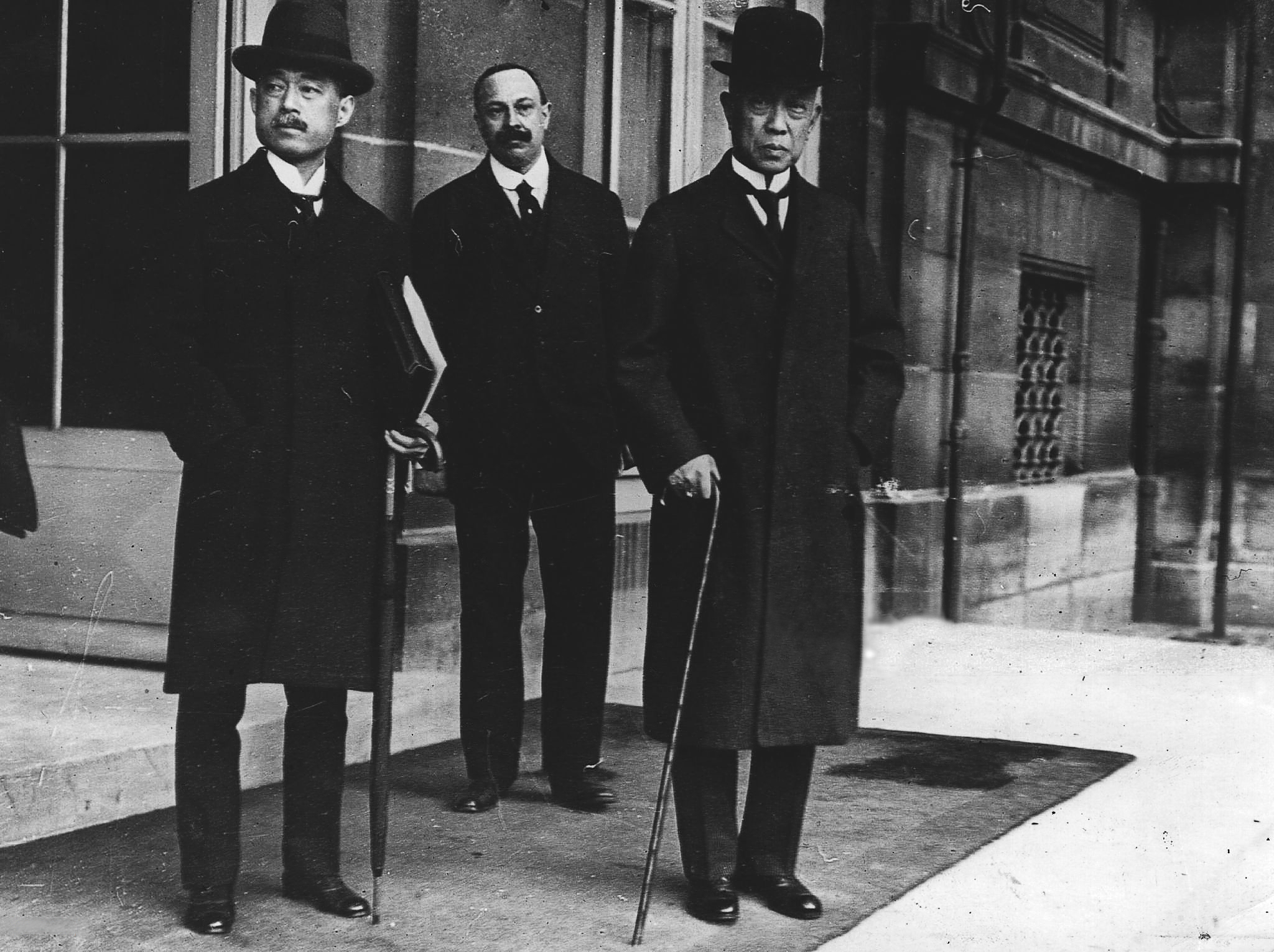
The genrō Saionji Kinmochi (right) at the Paris Peace Conference in 1919

Genrō (元老; lit. 'original elder') was an unofficial designation given to a generation of elder Japanese statesmen and military officers, all born between the 1830s and 1850s, who served as informal extraconstitutional advisors to the emperor during the Meiji, Taishō, and early Shōwa eras of Japanese history.

The institution of genrō originated with the traditional council of elders (Rōjū) common in the Edo period; however, the term genrō appears to have been coined by a newspaper only in 1892. The term is sometimes confused with the Genrōin (Chamber of Elders), a legislative body which existed from 1875–1890; however, the genrō were not related to the establishment of that body or its dissolution.

Experienced leaders of the Meiji Restoration were singled out by the Emperor as genkun (元勲; lit. 'original merit'), and asked to act as Imperial advisors. With the exception of Saionji Kinmochi, all the genrō were from middle or lower ranking samurai families, four each from Satsuma and Chōshū, the two former domains that had been instrumental in the overthrow of the former Tokugawa shogunate in the Boshin War of the Meiji Restoration of 1867–1868. The genrō had the right to select and nominate Prime Ministers to the Emperor for approval.

The first seven genrō were all formerly members of the Sangi (Imperial Council) which was abolished in 1885. They are also sometimes known to historians as the Meiji oligarchy, although not all of the Meiji oligarchs were genrō.

The institution expired in 1940, with the death of the last of the genrō, Saionji Kinmochi.

== List of genrō ==
Name	Origin	Portrait	Birth	Death
Inoue Kaoru	Chōshū		16 January 1836	1 September 1915
Itō Hirobumi	Chōshū		16 October 1841	26 October 1909
Katsura Tarō	Chōshū		4 January 1848	10 October 1913
Kuroda Kiyotaka	Satsuma		16 October 1840	23 August 1900
Matsukata Masayoshi	Satsuma		25 February 1835	2 July 1924
Ōyama Iwao	Satsuma		12 November 1842	10 December 1916
Saigō Tsugumichi	Satsuma		1 June 1843	18 July 1902
Saionji Kinmochi	Kuge		23 October 1849	24 November 1940
Yamagata Aritomo	Chōshū		14 June 1838	1 February 1922

== See also ==
- Council of Elders of the Bundestag (Germany)
- Privy council
