= Okitsu =

Okitsu (written: 興津 or 沖津) is a Japanese surname. Notable people with the surname include:

- Daizo Okitsu (興津 大三, born 1974), Japanese footballer
- Harue Okitsu (沖津 はる江, born 1949), Japanese alpine skier
- Kazuyuki Okitsu (興津 和幸, born 1980), Japanese voice actor

== See also ==
- Okitsu Station, a railway station in Shizuoka Prefecture, Japan
- Okitsu-juku, a station of the Tōkaidō in Shizuoka Prefecture
