= Wartime Law on Industrial Property (Japan) =

Wartime Law on Industrial Property (Kogyo Shoyuken Senji Ho) was a special law enacted by the Government of Japan in 1917, which declared that any patents owned by the nationals of countries in a state of war with Japan no longer had effect. The impact of this law was both immense and lasting, because a majority of drugs had been invented in Germany and this law meant that Japanese companies could produce them without worrying about patent infringement.

Statistics show that the number of new drugs in 1914 was 658 of which 103, or 16 per cent were developed domestically. By 1928, the number increased 2.6 times to 1,705 and the proportion of domestic development increased to 46 per cent. Further, by 1936, the number of new drugs increased to 2,402 of which more than half, 57 per cent were developed domestically.
