= Nihon no Uta Hyakusen =

Nihon no Uta Hyakusen (日本の歌百選; "collection of 100 Japanese songs") is a selection of songs and nursery rhymes widely beloved in Japan, sponsored by the Agency for Cultural Affairs and the Parents-Teachers Association of Japan. A poll was held in 2006 choosing the songs from a list of 895. The results were announced in 2007. Although it is called a compilation of 100 songs, the list includes 101 songs.

The idea for the compilation came from famed psychologist and agency chief Hayao Kawai, to prevent juvenile delinquency and to combat the "weakening" of Japan's shared cultural heritage. The agency released a CD and a songbook with printed melodies for all 101 songs to be used in public schools. The Asahi Shimbun used this list to compile a list of 15 most endangered children's songs.

The composer and lyricist for several songs published by the Japanese Ministry of Education in the early 1900s are unknown.

== The songs ==
The songs are numbered by the Japanese syllabary in gojūon ordering.

No.	Japanese title	English title (rōmaji)	Date	Lyricist/translator	Composer	Notes
1	仰げば尊し	Aogeba tōtoshi	1884	Fumihiko Ōtsuki, Satomi Tadashi, Kabe Iwao	H.N.D.	
2	赤い靴	Akai Kutsu	1922	Ujō Noguchi	Nagayo Motoori	
3	赤とんぼ	Akatombo	1927	Rofū Miki	Kōsaku Yamada	
4	朝はどこから	Asa wa doko kara	1946	Masaru Mori (森まさる)	Kunihiko Hashimoto	
5	あの町この町	Ano machi kono machi	1924	Ujō Noguchi	Shinpei Nakayama	
6	あめふり	Amefuri	1925	Hakushū Kitahara	Shinpei Nakayama	
7	雨降りお月さん	Amefuri otsukisan	1925	Ujō Noguchi	Shinpei Nakayama	
8	あめふりくまのこ	Amefuri kuma no ko	1962	Masao Tsurumi (鶴見正夫)	Akira Yuyama (湯山昭)	
9	いい日旅立ち	Ii Hi Tabidachi	1978	Shinji Tanimura	Shinji Tanimura	
10	いつでも夢を	Itsudemo yume o	1962	Takao Saeki (佐伯孝夫)	Tadashi Yoshida (吉田正)	
11	犬のおまわりさん	Inu no omawarisan	1960	Yoshimi Satō (佐藤義美)	Megumi Ohnaka	
12	上を向いて歩こう	Ue o muite arukō	1961	Rokusuke Ei	Hachidai Nakamura	also known as "Sukiyaki" originally sung by Kyu Sakamoto
13	海	Umi	1941	Ryūha Hayashi (林柳波)	Takeshi Inoue (井上武士)	
14	うれしいひなまつり	Ureshii hinamatsuri	1935	Hachirō Satō (サトウハチロー)	Kōyō Kawamura (河村光陽)	
15	江戸子守唄	Edo Lullaby	Edo period			traditional; lyricist and composer unknown
16	おうま	Ouma	1941	Ryūha Hayashi (林柳波)	Tsune Matsushima (松島つね)	
17	大きな栗の木の下で	Ōkina kurinoki no shita de				melody "Under the Spreading Chestnut Tree", traditional English folk song lyricist unknown Jaromír Weinberger composed an orchestral work based on the tune in 1939.
18	大きな古時計	Ōkina furudokei	1940	Kōgo Hotomi (保富康午) after Henry Clay Work	Henry Clay Work	melody "My Grandfather's Clock" (1876), American popular song
19	おかあさん	Okaasan	1954	Nana Tanaka (田中ナナ)	Yoshinao Nakada	
20	お正月	Oshōgatsu	1901	Kume Higashi (東くめ)	Rentarō Taki	
21	おはなしゆびさん	Ohanashiyubisan	1962	Yoshiko Kōyama (香山美子)	Akira Yuyama (湯山昭)	
22	朧月夜	Oborozuki yo	1914	Tatsuyuki Takano (高野辰之)	Teiichi Okano	
23	思い出のアルバム	Omoide no album	1981	Masuko Toshi (増子とし)	Tetsuma Honda (本多鉄麿)	
24	おもちゃのチャチャチャ	Omocha no chachacha	1962	Akiyuki Nosaka, Osamu Yoshioka	Nobuyoshi Koshibe (越部信義)	
25	かあさんの歌	Kaasan no uta	1954	Satoshi Kubota (窪田聡)	Satoshi Kubota (窪田聡)	
26	風	Kaze	1921	Yaso Saijō (西條八十) after Christina Rossetti	Shin Kusakawa	
27	肩たたき	Kata tataki	1923	Yaso Saijō (西條八十)	Shinpei Nakayama	
28	かもめの水兵さん	Kamome no Suihei-san	1937	Toshiko Takeuchi (武内俊子)	Kōyō Kawamura (河村光陽)	
29	からたちの花	Karatachi no hana	1925	Hakushū Kitahara	Kōsaku Yamada	
30	川の流れのように	Kawa no Nagare no Yō ni	1989	Yasushi Akimoto	Akira Mitake	
31	汽車	Kisha	1912	Ministry of Education	Aira Ōwada (大和田愛羅)	
32	汽車ポッポ	Kisha poppo	1938	Kaoru Fuhara (富原薫)	Shin Kusakawa	
33	今日の日はさようなら	Kyō no hi wa sayōnara	1966	Shōichi Kaneko (金子詔一)	Shōichi Kaneko (金子詔一)	
34	靴が鳴る	Kutsu ga naru	1919	Katsura Shimizu (清水かつら)	Ryūtarō Hirota	
35	こいのぼり	Koinobori	1931	Miyako Kondō (近藤宮子)		composer unknown
36	高校三年生	Koko sannensei	1963	Toshio Oka (丘灯至夫)	Minoru Endo (遠藤実)	
37	荒城の月	Kōjō no tsuki	1901	Bansui Doi (土井晩翠)	Rentarō Taki	
38	秋桜	Cosmos	1977	Masashi Sada	Masashi Sada	sung by Momoe Yamaguchi
39	この道	Kono michi	1927	Hakushū Kitahara	Kōsaku Yamada	
40	こんにちは赤ちゃん	Konnichiwa akachan	1963	Rokusuke Ei	Hachidai Nakamura	
41	さくら貝の歌	Sakuragai no uta	1949	Kajō Tsuchiya (土屋花情)	Hideaki Yashima (八洲秀章)	
42	さくらさくら	Sakura Sakura	1888			traditional; lyricist and composer unknown
43	サッちゃん	Satchan	1959	Hiroo Sakata (阪田寛夫)	Megumi Ohnaka	
44	里の秋	Sato no aki	1945	Nomuo Saito (斎藤信夫)	Minoru Kainuma (海沼實)	
45	幸せなら手をたたこう	Shiawase nara te o tatakō	1964	Rihito Kimura (木村利人)		melody "If You're Happy and You Know It", traditional Spanish (or Latvian, or American) folk song
46	叱られて	Shikararete	1972	Katsura Shimizu (清水かつら)	Ryūtarō Hirota	
47	四季の歌	Shiki no uta	1970?	Toyohisa Araki (荒木とよひさ)	Toyohisa Araki (荒木とよひさ)	
48	時代	Jidai	1975	Miyuki Nakajima	Miyuki Nakajima	
49	シャボン玉	Shabondama	1922	Ujō Noguchi	Shinpei Nakayama	
50	ずいずいずっころばし	Zuizui zukkorobashi				Warabe uta; lyricist and composer unknown
51	スキー	Sukī (Skiing)	1942	Otowa Shigure (時雨音羽)	Kōzaburō Hirai	
52	背くらべ	Seikurabe	1923	Atsushi Unno (海野厚)	Shinpei Nakayama	
53	世界に一つだけの花	Sekai ni hitotsu dake no hana	2003	Noriyuki Makihara	Noriyuki Makihara	
54	ぞうさん	Zō-san	1953	Michio Mado	Ikuma Dan	
55	早春賦	Sōshunfu	1913	Kazumasa Yoshimaru (吉丸一昌)	Akira Nakada (中田章)	
56	たきび	Takibi	1941	Seika Tatsumi (巽聖歌)	Shigeru Watanabe (渡辺茂)	
57	ちいさい秋みつけた	Chiisai Aki Mitsuketa	1955	Hachirō Satō (サトウハチロー)	Yoshinao Nakada	
58	茶摘み	Chatsumi	1912	Ministry of Education	Ministry of Education	
59	チューリップ	Chūrippu (Tulip)	1932	Miyako Kondō (近藤宮子)	Takeshi Inoue (井上武士)	
60	月の沙漠	Tsuki no sabaku	1923	Masao Katō (加藤まさを)	Suguru Sasaki (佐々木すぐる)	
61	翼をください	Tsubasa o Kudasai	1971	Michio Yamagami (山上路夫)	Kunihiko Murai (村井邦彦)	
62	手のひらを太陽に	Te no hira o taiyō ni	1961	Takashi Yanase (やなせたかし)	Taku Izumi (いずみたく)	
63	通りゃんせ	Tōryanse	Edo period			Warabe uta; lyricist and composer unknown
64	どこかで春が	Doko ka de haru ga	1923	Sōji Momota (百田宗治)	Shin Kusakawa	
65	ドレミのうた	Do-Re-Mi	1959	Peggy Hayama after Oscar Hammerstein II	Richard Rodgers	from the musical The Sound of Music
66	どんぐりころころ	Donguri korokoro	Taishō period	Nagayoshi Aoki (青木存義)	Tadashi Yanada	
67	とんぼのめがね	Tonbo no megane	1949	Seishi Nukaga (額賀誠志)	Kōzaburo Hirai	
68	ないしょ話	Naisho banashi	1939	Yoshio Yūki (結城よしを)	Yasuharu Yamaguchi (山口保治)	
69	涙そうそう	Nada Sōsō	1998	Ryōko Moriyama	BEGIN	original Okinawan language lyrics by BEGIN
70	夏の思い出	Natsu no omoide	1949	Shōko Ema (江間章子)	Yoshinao Nakada	
71	夏は来ぬ	Natsu wa kinu	1896	Nobutsuna Sasaki	Sakunosuke Koyama	
72	七つの子	Nanatsu no Ko	1921	Ujō Noguchi	Nagayo Motoori	
73	花〜すべての人の心に花を〜	Hana: Subete no hito no kokoro ni hana o	1980	Shoukichi Kina	Shoukichi Kina	
74	花	Hana	1900	Hagoromo Takeshima (武島羽衣)	Rentarō Taki	
75	花の街	Hana no machi	1947	Shōko Ema (江間章子)	Ikuma Dan	
76	埴生の宿	Hanyū no yado	1889	Tadashi Satomi (里見義) after John Howard Payne	Henry Bishop	melody "Home! Sweet Home!" from the opera Clari, Maid of Milan (1823)
77	浜千鳥	Hamachidori	1919	Meishū Kashima (鹿島鳴秋)	Ryūtarō Hirota	
78	浜辺の歌	Hamabe no uta	1916	Kokei Hayashi (林古渓)	Tamezō Narita	
79	春が来た	Haru ga kita	1910	Tatsuyuki Takano (高野辰之)	Teiichi Okano	
80	春の小川	Haru no ogawa	1912	Tatsuyuki Takano (高野辰之)	Teiichi Okano	
81	ふじの山	Fuji no yama	1911	Sazanami Iwaya	Ministry of Education	
82	冬景色	Fuyugeshiki	1913	Ministry of Education	Ministry of Education	
83	冬の星座	Fuyu no seiza	1947	Keizō Horiuchi (堀内敬三)	William Shakespeare Hays	melody "Mollie Darling" (1871), American popular song
84	故郷	Furusato	1914	Tatsuyuki Takano (高野辰之)	Teiichi Okano	
85	蛍の光	Hotaru no Hikari	1881	Chikai Inagaki (稲垣千穎)		melody "Auld Lang Syne", traditional Scottish song
86	牧場の朝	Makiba no asa	1932	Sojinkan Sugimura (杉村楚人冠)	Eikichi Funabashi (船橋榮吉)	
87	見上げてごらん夜の星を	Miagete Goran Yoru no Hoshi o	1963	Rokusuke Ei	Taku Izumi (いずみたく)	
88	みかんの花咲く丘	Mikan no hana saku oka	1946	Shōgo Katō (加藤省吾)	Minoru Kainuma (海沼實)	
89	蟲のこゑ	Mushi no koe	1910	Ministry of Education	Ministry of Education	
90	むすんでひらいて	Musunde hiraite	1947	Ministry of Education	Jean-Jacques Rousseau	melody "Go Tell Aunt Rhody" from the opera Le devin du village (1752)
91	村祭	Muramatsuri	1942	Shigeru Kuzuhara	Yoshie Minami (南能衛)	
92	めだかの学校	Medaka no gakkō	1950	Shigeru Chaki (茶木滋)	Yoshinao Nakada	
93	もみじ	Momiji	1911	Tatsuyuki Takano (高野辰之)	Teiichi Okano	
94	椰子の実	Yashinomi	1936	Tōson Shimazaki	Toraji Ōnaka (大中寅二)	
95	夕日	Yūhi	1921	Shigeru Kuzuhara	Kingetsu Murozaki (室崎琴月)	
96	夕焼小焼	Yūyake koyake	1923	Ukō Nakamura (中村雨紅)	Shin Kusakawa	
97	雪	Yuki	1911	Ministry of Education	Ministry of Education	
98	揺籃のうた	Yurikago no uta	1921	Hakushū Kitahara	Shin Kusakawa	
99	旅愁	Ryoshū	1907	Kyūkei Indō (犬童球渓) after John P. Ordway	John P. Ordway	melody "Dreaming of Home and Mother" (1851), American popular song
100	リンゴの唄	Ringo no uta	1945	Hachirō Satō (サトウハチロー)	Tadashi Manjōme (万城目正)	from the 1945 film Soyokaze (そよかぜ) directed by Yasushi Sasaki
101	われは海の子	Ware wa umi no ko	1910	Kōichirō Miyahara (宮原晃一郎)	Ministry of Education	
