= Megumi Ohnaka =

Japanese composer

Megumi Ohnaka (大中恩), who also used the pseudonym Ai Tsuchida (July 24, 1924 - December 3, 2018), was a Japanese composer known for his children's songs (doyo) and choruses, as well as his live "Song Song" parties, which he began in 1961.

In 1945, he graduated from the composition department of Tokyo Music School, into which he had matriculated in 1942. The same year he was drafted into the Imperial Japanese Navy. In 1955, he formed Roba no Kai with Yoshinao Nakada, Toshi Isobe, Mitsutoshi Ugajin, and Kazutsugu Nakada. In 1957, he formed Goal Me through the activities of the mixed chorus PF Call (1946-1955), which disbanded after thirty years in 1987. In 1968, he formed the female chorus, Cole Grace.

In 1989, he received the Medal of Honor with Purple Ribbon for individuals who have contributed to academic and artistic developments, improvements, and accomplishments.

== Awards won ==
- The Agency for Cultural Affairs Art Festival Encouragement Award 1965

Kazuyoshi Akiyama Conductor, Japan Chorus Association Mixed Chorus "Brick Color Town" (Poetry: Hiroo Sakata)

- The Agency for Cultural Affairs Art Festival Encouragement Award 1966

"Balloons of Love" (Poetry: Chieko Nakamura)

- The Agency for Cultural Affairs Art Festival Encouragement Award 1968

"Run My Heart" (Poetry: Umihiko Ito)

- The Agency for Cultural Affairs Art Festival Excellence Award 1970

Mixed chorus "Shimayo" (Poetry: Umihiko Ito)

- The Japanese Nursery Rhyme Award 1982

"Inu no Omawari-san" (lyrics: Yoshimi Sato) "Satchan" "Tummy Hell Uta" (Lyrics: Hiroo Sakata), Awarded in categories "Modern Children's Song Selection Collection / Megumi Ohnaka Selection Collection"

- April 1989 Received the Medal with Purple Ribbon
- 1995 Received the Order of the Rising Sun, Gold Rays
- Children's Song Culture Award (2004)
- Nikken Ono Nursery Rhyme Culture Award (2006)

== Selected works ==
- Mixed chorus setting of "Wataridori" poem by Hakushu Kitahara 1943
- Art song: "Covered Wagon" (poetry: Yaso Saijo), 1944
- Five Lyric Songs (poetry: Haruo Sato, Rofu Miki), 1945, premiered by Ryosuke Hatanaka
- The World Will Destroy (musical), 1965

== Recordings ==
- Children's Songs King Records SKM(H)2245.
- "Yashi no Mi" (Cocoanuts), Jean-Pierre Rampal, Ensemble Lunaire. Japanese Folk Melodies transcribed bu Akio Yashiro. CBS Records, 1978.

== Official site ==
- https://www.ohnakamegumi.com/
