= Furusato (children's song) =

Song by Teiichi Okano and Tatsuyuki Takano
- Published: 1914
- Genre: Children's music
- Composer: Teiichi Okano
- Lyricist: Tatsuyuki Takano

Furusato (Japanese: 故郷; 'old home' or 'hometown') is a well-known 1914 Japanese children's song, with music by Teiichi Okano and lyrics by Tatsuyuki Takano.

Although Takano's hometown was Nakano, Nagano, his lyrics do not seem to refer to a particular place. Instead, they describe a person who is working in a distant land, expressing his feelings of nostalgia for the hills and fields of his childhood home.

== Background ==
The Japanese government has designated Furusato as a Japanese children's song to be taught in the Japanese public school system, and the song has also been included in the recent popular song collection known as Nihon no Uta Hyakusen.

The composer and the writer of the song were unknown until the 1970s. Since 1992, however, the names of both Teiichi Okano and Tatsuyuki Takano have been printed with the song in Japanese music textbooks.

At the closing ceremony of the 1998 Winter Olympics in Nagano, the song was played, and in 2014, in commemoration of the 100th anniversary of Furusato, the song was performed by children's chorus with orchestral accompaniment at the Saito Kinen Festival Matsumoto in Nagano, under the direction of Seiji Ozawa.

Plácido Domingo, one of The Three Tenors, sang the song in Japanese at his concert that held in NHK hall on April 10, 2011.

== Lyrics ==
Standard

兎追いし 彼の山
小鮒釣りし 彼の川
夢は今も 巡りて
忘れ難き 故郷

如何にいます 父母
恙無しや 友がき
雨に風に つけても
思い出づる 故郷

志を 果たして
いつの日にか 帰らん
山は青き 故郷
水は清き 故郷

Hiragana

うさぎおいし かのやま
こぶなつりし かのかわ
ゆめはいまも めぐりて
わすれがたき ふるさと

いかにいます ちちはは
つつがなしや ともがき
あめにかぜに つけても
おもいいづる ふるさと

こころざしを はたして
いつのひにか かえらん
やまはあおき ふるさと
みずはきよき ふるさと

Romaji

usagi oishi ka no yama
ko-buna tsurishi ka no kawa
yume wa ima mo megurite
wasure-gataki furusato

ika ni imasu chichi-haha
tsutsuganashi ya tomogaki
ame ni, kaze ni tsukete mo
omoi-izuru furusato

kokorozashi o hata shite
itsu no hi ni ka kaeran
yama wa aoki furusato
mizu wa kiyoki furusato

Translation

I chased after rabbits on that mountain.
I fished for minnow in that river.
I still dream of those days even now
Oh, how I miss my old country home.

Father and mother―are they doing well?
Is everything well with my old friends?
When the rain falls, when the wind blows,
I stop and recall of my old country home.

Some day when I have done what I set out to do,
I'll return home one of these days
Where the mountains are green, my old country home,
Where the waters are clear, my old country home.

== English version ==
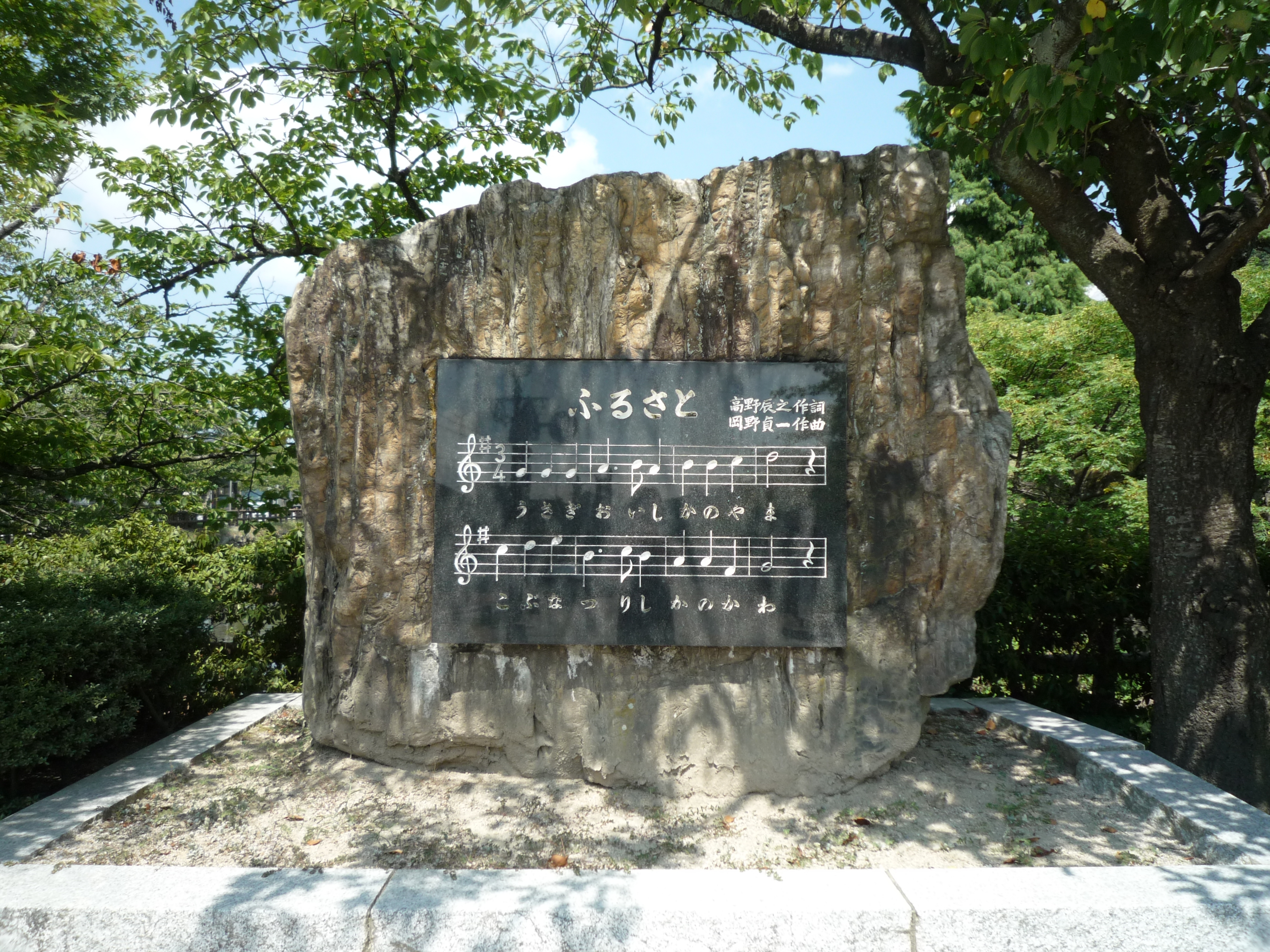
Furusato monument in Tottori Prefecture.

The song was translated into English by Greg Irwin and this was published in the album called "Japan's Best Loved Songs of the Season" in 1998. This version was also performed by Lexi Walker.
