= Toys Dancing Cha Cha Cha =

"Toys Dancing Cha Cha Cha" (Japanese: おもちゃのチャチャチャ, romanized: omocha no cha cha cha) is a Japanese nursery rhyme written by Akiyuki Nosaka and Osamu Yoshioka, as well as composed by Nobuyoshi Koshibe. It was selected as Children's Song Award in 5th Japan Record Awards and Nihon no Uta Hyakusen.

== Etymology ==
"Omocha no Cha Cha Cha" (おもちゃのチャチャチャ) combines the Japanese words omocha (おもちゃ, toy) and cha-cha-cha (チャチャチャ, a dance). It depicts toys are dancing at night.

== History ==
The song was first played as an interlude in Yamaha Time (ヤマハ・タイム) of Fuji TV, aired in 1959. It was originally written by Torirō Miki, later revised by Akiyuki Nosaka and composed by Nobuyoshi Koshibe. The interlude version lyrics was different to the current version, while Osamu Yoshioka later rewrote the lyrics. The Yoshioka version was later featured in the "song of month" (今月の歌) segment of Uta no Ehon, a children TV program of NHK General TV. It was first sung by Yoshiko Mari and Keiko Nakano. Mari's single of the song sold 40,000 copies in a month at the time.

The song was selected as Children's Song Award in 5th Japan Record Awards. It was also included in a music sheet collection of NHK Minna no Uta (NHKみんなのうた), released by NHK in 1966, with the lyrics rewritten. It became the current version the people known today and song has been aired in NHK even after Uta no Ehon was changed to Okaasan to Issho. All Uta no Onēsan and Uta no Onīsan performers sing the song.

== Copyright status ==
Since Yoshioka, Koshibe, and Nosaka died in 2010, 2014, and 2015 respectively, the song is still in copyright term and protected by copyright.

== Covers ==
Various covers of the song in foreign languages exist. The first known English cover was Toys Dancing Cha Cha Cha by Henry V. Drennan, released in 1979. and The Toy Cha Cha by Greg Irwin, as well as Toys Dance The Cha Cha Cha in 2005., etc.

== Reception ==
Toys Dancing Cha Cha Cha was selected for the Children's Song Award in 5th Japan Record Awards. It was also included in Nihon no Uta Hyakusen, a collection run by the Agency for Cultural Affairs. According to Tamahiyo, a magazine for pregnant women and families published by Benesse, Toys Dancing Cha Cha Cha rank first among songs mothers wish their children to listen to.
