= Tamezō Narita =

Japanese composer

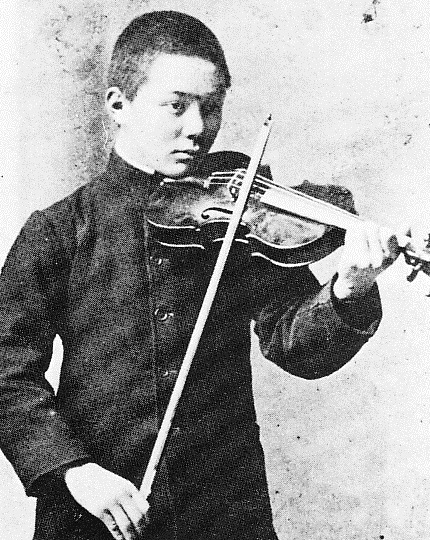
- Born: 15 December 1893; Kitaakita District, Akita
- Died: 29 October 1945 (aged 51)

Tamezō Narita (成田為三, Narita Tamezō; 15 December 1893 – 29 October 1945) was a Japanese composer.

Narita was born in Yonaizawa, Kitaakita District, Akita.

== Works, editions and recordings ==
Songs

- Kanariya (かなりや "Canary") 1918
- Akai Tori Kotori (赤い鳥小鳥 "Red bird, small bird"); lyrics by Hakushū Kitahara
- Hamabe no uta (浜辺の歌 "Song of the beach"); lyrics by Kokei Hayashi. Recording Kazumichi Ohno (tenor), Kyosuke Kobayashi (piano); later recorded by Jean-Pierre Rampal (flute), Ensemble Lunaire. Japanese Folk Melodies transcribed by Akio Yashiro. CBS Records, 1978.
- Akita Prefectural Anthem (秋田県民歌 "Song of Akita Prefecture "); lyrics by Masatsugu Kurata.
