= Jean-Pierre Rampal =

French flautist (1922–2000)

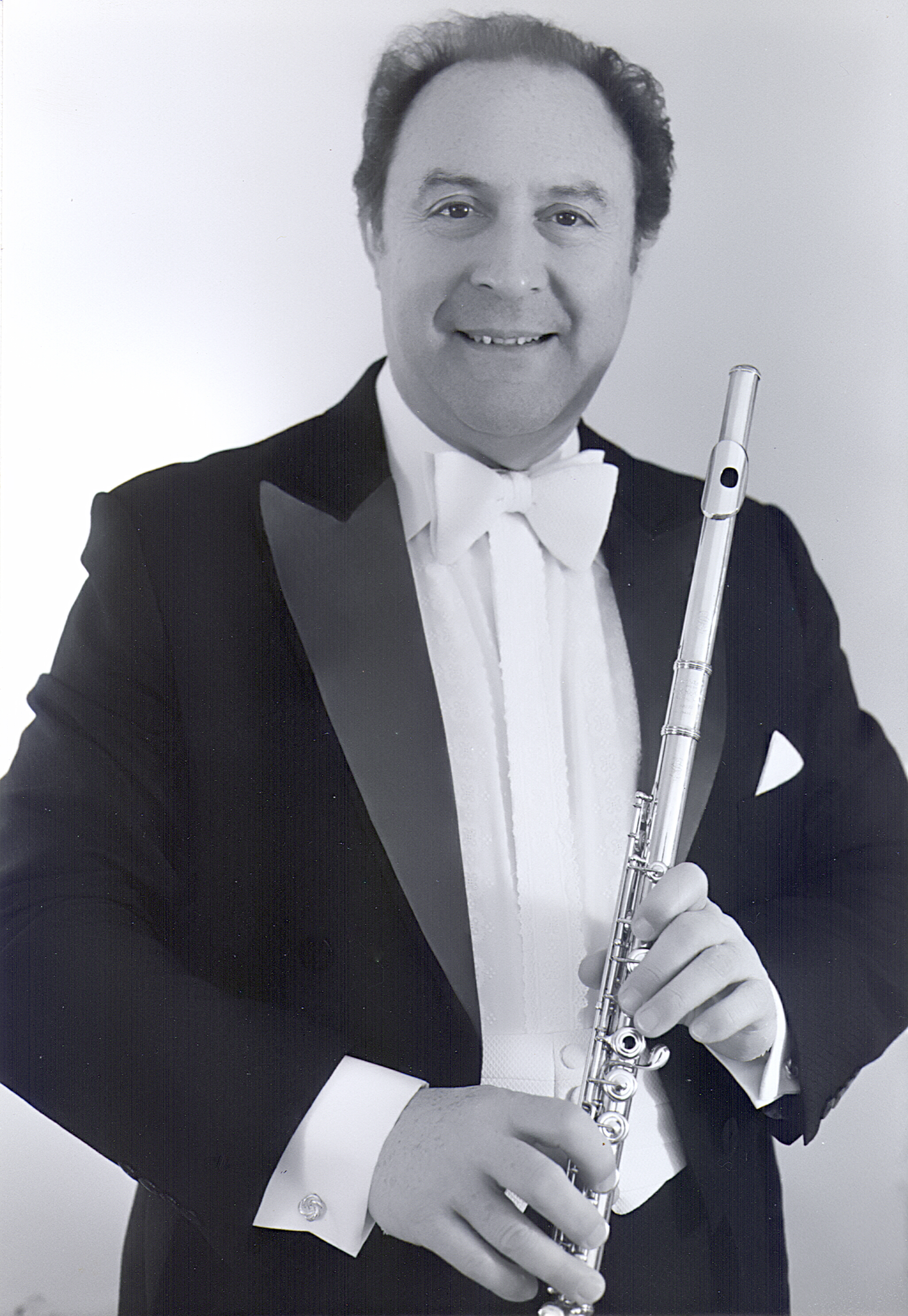

Background information
- Born: Jean-Pierre Louis Rampal; 7 January 1922; Marseille, France
- Died: 20 May 2000 (aged 78) Paris, France
- Occupations: Flautist, conductor
- Years active: 1940s–2000

Jean-Pierre Louis Rampal (7 January 1922 – 20 May 2000) was a French flautist and conductor. Rampal popularised the flute in the post–World War II years, recovering flute compositions from the Baroque era, and spurring contemporary composers, such as Francis Poulenc, to create new works that have become modern standards in the flautist's repertoire.

== Biography ==
=== Early years ===
Born in Marseille, (Note: Rampal's autobiography gives the address as 20 rue Brochier in central Marseille.) the only child of Andrée (née Roggero) and flautist Joseph Rampal. His father Joseph was taught by Hennebains, who also taught Rene le Roy and Marcel Moyse. (Note: Joseph Rampal studied flute at the Paris Conservatoire where Adolphe Hennebains (1862–1914) had in 1909 succeeded Paul Taffanel as professor of flute. Joseph Rampal went on to win the First Prize in the Conservatoire's annual flute competition in 1919.)

Under the tutelage of his father, Rampal began playing the flute at the age of 12. He studied the Altès method at the Conservatoire, where he won first prize in the school's annual flute competition in 1937 at age 16. This was also the year of his first public recital at the Salle Mazenod in Marseille. By then, Rampal was playing second flute alongside his father in the Orchestre des Concerts Classiques de Marseille.

His career in music began without the full encouragement of his parents. Rampal's mother and father encouraged him to become a doctor or surgeon as they felt those professions were more reliable than becoming a professional musician. At the beginning of the Second World War, Rampal duly entered medical school in Marseille, studying there for three years. In 1943, authorities of the Nazi Occupation of France drafted him for forced labour in Germany. To avoid this, he fled to Paris, where it was easier to avoid detection, by frequently changing his lodgings.

While in Paris, Rampal auditioned to study flute at the Paris Conservatoire, where he was taught by Gaston Crunelle from January 1944. Years later, he succeeded Crunelle as flute professor at the Conservatoire. After four months, Rampal's performance of Jolivet's Le chant de Linos won him the coveted first prize in the conservatory's annual flute competition. (Note: Joseph won first prize playing Busser's "Thème Varié".)

=== Post-war success ===
In 1945, following the liberation of Paris, Rampal was invited by the composer Henri Tomasi—then conductor of the Orchestre National de France—to perform the Flute Concerto by Jacques Ibert, written for Marcel Moyse in 1934, live on French National Radio. It launched his concert career and was the first of many such broadcasts.

With the war over, Rampal embarked on a series of performances: at first, within France; and then, in 1947, in Switzerland, Austria, Italy, Spain, and the Netherlands. Almost from the beginning, he was accompanied by pianist and harpsichordist Robert Veyron-Lacroix, whom he had met at the Paris Conservatoire in 1946. (Note: For his first professional recital, given in Marseille in July 1941, Rampal was accompanied by pianist Pierre Barbizet.) Rampal viewed himself as having a somewhat emotional Provençal temperament, while Veyron-Lacroix was a more refined character (a "true upper class Parisian"). The appearance of this duo after the war has been described as a "complete novelty", allowing them to make a rapid impact on the music-going public in France and elsewhere. In March 1949, in the face of some scepticism, they hired the Salle Gaveau in Paris to perform a recital programme made up solely of chamber music for flute, which then seemed radical. It was one of the first flute/piano recitals the city had seen, and caused a "sensation". The success encouraged Rampal to continue, repeating the recital the following year in Paris. Throughout the early 1950s, the duo made regular radio broadcasts and gave concerts across Europe. Their first international tour in 1953 spanned Indonesia. From 1954 onward, he held his first concerts in eastern Europe—most significantly in Prague, where he premiered Jindrich Feld's Flute Concerto in 1956. In the same year, he appeared in Canada at the Menton festival, where he played for the first time in concert with violinist Isaac Stern, who became a lifelong friend and a considerable influence on Rampal's own approach.

On 14 February 1958, Rampal and Veyron-Lacroix made their US debut with a recital of Poulenc, Bach, Mozart, Beethoven, and Prokofiev in Washington, D.C. at the Library of Congress. In 1959, Rampal gave his first concert in New York City, at the Town Hall. Rampal's successful partnership with Veyron-Lacroix produced their 1962 double LP of the complete Bach flute sonatas. They performed and toured together for about 35 years, until the early 1980s, when Veyron-Lacroix was forced to retire due to ill health. Rampal then formed a new, 20-year long musical partnership with American pianist John Steele Ritter.

While he pursued his career as a soloist, Rampal remained an ensemble player throughout his life. In 1946, he and oboist Pierre Pierlot founded the Quintette a Vent Francais (French Wind Quintet), formed of a group of musical friends who had made their way through the war: Rampal, Pierlot, clarinetist Jacques Lancelot, bassoonist Paul Hongne, and horn-player Gilbert Coursier. Early in 1944, they had played together, broadcasting at night from a secret "cave" radio station at the Club d’essai in rue de Bec, Paris—a programme of music outlawed by the Nazis, including works with Jewish links by composers such as Hindemith, Schoenberg and Milhaud. The Quintet remained active until the 1960s.

Between 1955 and 1962, Rampal took up the post of principal flute at the Paris Opera, traditionally the most prestigious orchestral position open to a French flautist. Having been married in 1947 and now a father of two, the post offered him a regular income.

=== Recovering Baroque music ===
Rampal's first commercial recording, made in 1946 for the Boite a Musique label in Montparnasse, Paris, was of Mozart's Flute Quartet in D, with the Trio Pasquier. A key element in Rampal's success in the years immediately after World War II was his passion for the music of the Baroque era. Aside from a few works by Bach and Vivaldi, Baroque music was still largely unrecognised when Rampal started out. He desired to promote the flute as a prominent solo instrument, which required a wide and flexible repertoire. From the start, he was aware of the "Golden Age of the Flute", as the Baroque era had become known. Hundreds of concertos and chamber works written for the flute in the 18th century had fallen into obscurity, and he felt that the sheer abundance of this early material might offer long-term possibilities for an aspiring soloist.

Even before World War II, he had begun collecting obscure sheet music from the Baroque, making himself familiar with original publishers and catalogues despite very few published editions being available. He went on to research in libraries and archives in Paris, Berlin, Vienna, Turin, and every other major city he performed in, and corresponded with others across the musical world. He studied Quantz and his treatise On Playing The Flute (1752), and later acquired an original copy of it. For Rampal, the Baroque legacy could spark a renewed interest in the flute. Whereas Le Roy, Laurent and Barrère had all recorded two or three of Bach's flute sonatas between 1929 and 1939, between 1947 and 1950 Rampal recorded all of them for Boîte à Musique. He was also beginning to regularly perform the complete Bach sonatas in recital, organising them across two evenings. As early as 1950–51, he became the first to record all six of Vivaldi's Op.10 concertos.

In an interview with The New York Times, he offered an explanation for the appeal of Baroque music after the war: "With all this bad mess we had in Europe during the war, people were looking for something quieter, more structured, more well balanced than Romantic music." He applied his own style to the original texts, developing an individual approach to interpretation and, after the Baroque style, to improvised ornamentation. (Note: His 1970s recording of four Tartini concertos (ERATO STU 71061) is a good example of this enterprise, although the manner of the decorated repeats, as played by Rampal, was based on original notes and directions by Tartini himself and not simply the result of some loosely imagined Baroque "style".) Throughout, Rampal was never tempted to perform on a period instrument; the movement that championed "authentic" instruments for "true" performance of Baroque music had not yet emerged. Instead, he drew on the full range of effects offered by the modern flute to play the Baroque compositions. "Enchantment is the best possible word to describe this concert", said one Canadian reviewer for Le Devoir in 1956; "Rampal's playing struck me through its variety, its flexibility, its colour and above all its liveliness." His earliest recordings were 1946 and 1950, and Rampal benefited from the birth of the long-playing gramophone record. Before 1950, all of his recordings were on 78 rpm discs. After 1950, the 33⅓ rpm long-playing era allowed much greater freedom to accommodate the rate at which he was recording performances. At the same time, the birth of the television age ensured Rampal a wider prominence in France than any previous flute-player, through his many concert and recital appearances in the late 1950s and beyond.

Rampal also published a large amount of what he performed and recorded, supervising sheet music collections in both Europe and the US. In his autobiography, he remarked that he had felt it part of his "duty" to expand as much as possible the repertoire for fellow flautists as well as for himself. Rampal also played in as many groups and combinations as he could.

In 1952 he founded the Ensemble Baroque de Paris, featuring himself, Veyron-Lacroix, Pierlot, Hongne, and violinist Robert Gendre. Remaining together over almost three decades, the ensemble was one of the first musical groups to bring to light the chamber repertoire of the 18th century.

==== Collaborations ====
Through his recordings for labels including L'Oiseau-Lyre and, from the mid-1950s, Erato, Rampal continued to give new currency to many "lost" concertos by Italian composers such as Tartini, Cimarosa, Sammartini, and Pergolesi (often collaborating with Claudio Scimone and I Solisti Veneti); French composers including Devienne, Leclair, and Loeillet; as well as other works from the Potsdam court of the flute-playing king Frederick the Great. His 1955 collaboration in Prague with Czech flautist, composer, and conductor Milan Munclinger resulted in a recording of flute concertos by Benda and Richter. In 1956, with Louis Froment, he recorded concertos in A minor and G major by C.P.E. Bach. Other composers of the era, such as Haydn, Handel, Stamitz, and Quantz, also figured significantly in his repertoire. He was open to experimentation; once, through laborious over-dubbing, he played all five parts in an early recording of a flute quintet by Boismortier. Rampal was the first flautist to record most, if not all, of the flute works by Bach, Handel, Telemann, Vivaldi, and other composers who came to comprise the core repertoire for flute players.

Rampal extended his research into the Classical and Romantic eras in order to establish some continuity to the repertoire of his instrument. His first "recital" LP, released in both America and Europe, featured music from Bach, Beethoven, Hindemith, Honegger, and Dukas. Aside from recording familiar composers such as Mozart, Schumann, and Schubert, Rampal also helped bring the works of composers such as Reinecke, Gianella, and Mercadante back into view. From the start, his recital programmes included modern compositions as well. In 1948, as part of his debut recital in Paris, Rampal gave the first Western performance of Prokofiev's Sonata for Flute and Piano in D, which in the 1940s was being co-opted for the violin despite originally having been written for flute. Later, when preparing a new sheet music edition published by the International Music Company of New York, Rampal consulted Russian violinist David Oistrakh to achieve the best result. Over his career, he performed many of the flute compositions of the first half of the 20th century, including works by Debussy, Ravel, Roussel, Ibert, Milhaud, Martinů, Hindemith, Honegger, Dukas, Françaix, Damase, and Feld.

As a chamber musician, he continued to collaborate with numerous other soloists, forming collaborations with violinist Isaac Stern and cellist Mstislav Rostropovich. A number of composers wrote especially for Rampal, including Henri Tomasi (Sonatine pour flûte seule, 1949), Jean Françaix (Divertimento, 1953), André Jolivet (Concerto, 1949), Jindřich Feld (Sonata, 1957), and Jean Martinon (Sonatine). Others included Jean Rivier, Antoine Tisné, Serge Nigg, Charles Chaynes, and Maurice Ohana. In addition, he premiered works by contemporary composers such as Leonard Bernstein, Aaron Copland, Ezra Laderman, David Diamond, and Krzysztof Penderecki. In 1968, at the composer's own suggestion, he transcribed Aram Khachaturian's Violin Concerto (recorded 1970). In 1978, the Armenian-American composer Alan Hovhaness wrote his Symphony No. 36, which contained a melodic flute part tailored especially for Rampal, who gave the premiere performance of the work in concert with the National Symphony Orchestra.

The only piece dedicated to Rampal that he never publicly performed was the Sonatine (1946) by Pierre Boulez, which he found too abstract for his taste. (Note: It was left for Severino Gazzelloni to premiere the Sonatine in 1954.) When criticised for not playing enough contemporary avant-garde work—"Avant garde of what?" he would ask—Rampal confirmed his aversion to music that looked "like the blueprints for a plumber... pieces that go tweak, twonk, thump, snort—this doesn't inspire me."

Rampal's compatriot Francis Poulenc was commissioned by the Coolidge Foundation of America in 1957 to write a new flute piece. The composer consulted with Rampal regularly on shaping the flute part, and the result, in Rampal's own words, is "a pearl of the flute literature". The official world premiere of Poulenc's Sonata for Flute and Piano was performed on 17 June 1957 by Rampal, accompanied by the composer, at the Strasbourg Festival. Unofficially, however, they had performed it a day or two earlier for the pianist Artur Rubinstein, a friend of Poulenc's. He was unable to stay in Strasbourg for the evening of the concert itself, so the duo obliged him with a private performance. Poulenc was then unable to travel to Washington for the US premiere on 14 February 1958, so Veyron-Lacroix took his place, and the sonata became a key offering in Rampal's US recital debut, helping launch his trans-Atlantic career.

=== Continued popularity ===
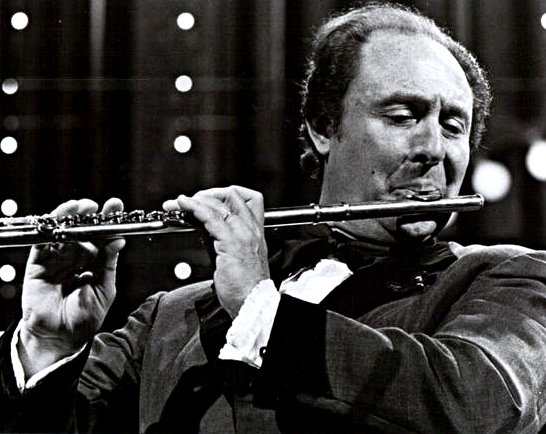
At Boston Pops show in 1977

Throughout the 1960s, 1970s, and 1980s, Rampal remained especially popular in the US and Japan (where he had first toured in 1964). He toured America annually and was a regular presence at the Mostly Mozart Festival at the Lincoln Center in New York. At his busiest, he performed between 150 and 200 concerts a year.

Rampal with Veyron-Lacroix 1959, photo dedicated on the first of three acclaimed Southern Africa musical tours organised by Hans Adler.

Alongside the classical recordings, he recorded Catalan and Scottish folk songs, Indian music with sitarist Ravi Shankar, and, accompanied by the French harpist Lily Laskine, an album of Japanese folk melodies that was named album of the year in Japan. He also recorded Scott Joplin rags and Gershwin, as well as collaborating with French jazz pianist Claude Bolling. The Suite for Flute and Jazz Piano (1975), written by Bolling especially for Rampal, topped the US Billboard charts and remained there for ten years. This raised his profile with the American public even further and led, in January 1981, to a TV appearance on Jim Henson's The Muppet Show, where he played "Lo, Hear the Gentle Lark" with Miss Piggy, as well as "Ease on Down the Road" in a scene loosely based on the folktale of the Pied Piper.

On the classical stage, he was not afraid to be "a bit of a ham"; when performing Scott Joplin's Ragtime Dance and Stomp as a concert hall encore, he provided extra percussion by stamping his feet rhythmically on stage in time to the music. Bolling and Rampal came together again for Bolling's Picnic Suite (1980) with guitarist Alexander Lagoya, the Suite No. 2 for Flute and Jazz Piano (1987), and also to perform the instrumental theme song "Goodbye For Now" by Stephen Sondheim for Reds, Warren Beatty's 1981 movie about the Communist revolution in Russia. His reputation as a celebrity soloist in America became such that, as Esquire reported, one critic dubbed him "the Alexander of the flute, with no new worlds to conquer." Following a performance of Mozart's Concerto for Flute, Harp, and Orchestra with the New York Philharmonic in 1976, New York Times critic Harold C. Schonberg wrote "Mr. Rampal, with his effortless long line, his sweet and pure tone and his sensitive musicianship, is of course one of the great flutists in history." Throughout these years of mounting popularity, Rampal continued to research and edit sheet-music editions of flute works for publishing houses including Georges Billaudot in Paris and the International Music Company in the US.

=== Retirement and death ===
In later years, Rampal conducted more frequently, but he continued to play well into his late 70s. The last work of importance dedicated to him was Krzysztof Penderecki's Flute Concerto which he premiered in Switzerland in 1992, followed by its first performance in America at Lincoln Center. Rampal's last public recital was held at the Theatre Villamarta in Jerez de la Frontera (Spain) in November 1999, when he was 77; he performed works by Bach, Mozart, Kuhlau and Mendelssohn. His last recording was made with the Pasquier Trio and flautist Claudi Arimany (trio and quartets by Mozart and Hoffmeister) in Paris in December 1999.

After Rampal died in Paris of heart failure in May 2000 at age 78, French president Jacques Chirac led the tributes, saying "his flute spoke to the heart. A light in the musical world has just flickered out." Flautist Eugenia Zukerman observed: "He played with such a rich palette of color in a way that few people had done before and no one since. He had an ability to imbue sound with texture and clarity and emotional content. He was a dazzling virtuoso, but more than anything he was a supreme poet." The trustees and staff of Carnegie Hall in New York, where Rampal had performed 45 times over a 29-year period, hailed him as "one of the greatest flutists of the 20th Century and one of the greatest musical spirits of our time." The obituary in Le Monde claimed him to be no less than "L'inventeur de la flute" and celebrated his musical characteristics: "la sonorite sublime, la vivacite des phrases, la virtuosite laissaient une impression de bonheur, de joie a ses auditeurs".

James Galway, Rampal's globally known successor as "The Man with the Golden Flute", dedicated performances to him and recalled how as a teenager he had been captivated by the sound of Rampal's "fluid technique" and "the beauty of his tone". For a young musician in the 1960s, he said, listening to Rampal's recordings "was a step into the stars as far as flute playing was concerned." He also recalled generous encouragement Rampal gave him following their meetings in Paris. Of the passing of his "hero", Galway added: "He was the first major influence in my life and I am still grateful for everything he ever did for me. He was a great influence on the flute world and the musical world in general, bringing to ordinary folk through his music making a charm which enhanced their everyday lives."

At Rampal's funeral, fellow flautists played the Adagio from Boismortier's Second Flute Concerto in A Minor in recognition of his lifelong passion for Baroque music in general and Boismortier in particular.

Jean-Pierre Rampal is buried in the Cimetière du Montparnasse, Paris.

== L'homme à la flûte d'or ==
Rampal was the owner of the only solid gold flute (No. 1375) made, in 1869, by the great French craftsman Louis Lot. Rumours of the survival of the 18-carat gold Lot had been circulating in France for years before the Second World War, but no one knew where the piece had gone. In 1948, Rampal acquired the instrument from an antiques dealer who had wanted to melt the instrument down for the gold, unaware that he was in possession of the flute equivalent of a Stradivarius. (Note: It had originally been sent to Shanghai, a retirement gift commissioned in the 1860s for French flautist Jean Remusat, who became president of the Shanghai Philharmonic Society; somehow it found its way back to Europe, albeit in pieces.) With family help, Rampal raised enough funds to rescue the instrument, and went on to perform and record with it for 11 years. (Note: His first performance on record with the unique gold Lot is thought to be the recording he made in April 1948 of Bach's E minor Sonata, BWV 1034.) In interviews, Rampal said he thought the gold, by contrast with silver, made his naturally bright, sparkling sound "a little darker; the colour is a little warmer, I like it". Only in 1958, when presented during his debut US tour with a 14-carat gold instrument made after the Lot pattern by the William S. Haynes Flute Company of Boston, did Rampal stop using the 1869 original. After one final recording in London, (Note: Thought to be Bach's Brandenburg Concerto No. 5 with the Academy of St Martin in the Fields) he consigned the golden Lot to a bank vault in France, and thereafter made the Haynes his concert instrument of choice.

== Artistry ==
Of the primal appeal of the flute, Rampal once told the Chicago Tribune: "For me, the flute is really the sound of humanity, the sound of man flowing, completely free from his body almost without an intermediary[...] Playing the flute is not as direct as singing, but it's nearly the same."

Calling Rampal "an indisputably major artist", The New York Times said "Rampal's popularity was grounded in qualities that won him consistent praise from critics and musicians in the first decades of his career: solid musicianship, technical command, uncanny breath control, and a distinctive tone that eschewed Romantic richness and warm vibrato in favor of clarity, radiance, focus and a wide palette of colorings. Younger flutists assiduously studied and tried to copy his approaches to tonguing, fingering, embouchure (the position of the lips on the mouthpiece) and breathing."

Throughout the busiest years of his concert career, Rampal continued to teach others, encouraging his students to listen not only to other flute players, but also to take inspiration from other musical interpreters such as pianists, violinists, or singers. He maintained a clear opinion about the right balance between virtuosity and aspiring to real musical expressiveness. "Of course," he said, "you have to master all the problems of technique to be free to express yourself through your instrument. You can have a big imagination and a big heart but you cannot express it without technique. But the first quality you must have to be good, to be inspiring, is the sound. Without the sound you cannot achieve anything. The tone, the sound, the sonorité is most important. Otherwise, with the fingers alone it is not enough... everyone these days has the fingers, the virtuosity... but the sound, the tone, that's not so easy."

Following the foundation of the Nice Summer Academy in 1959, Rampal held classes there annually until 1977. In 1969, he succeeded Gaston Crunelle as flute professor at the Paris Conservatoire, a position he held until 1981. William Bennett commented on Rampal's enthusiasm for music-making: "his repute came more from his musical sparkle and the happy personality which radiated to the audience". Bennett had also sought Rampal out for lessons in Paris and was "instantly delighted with him—his humour, and his generosity—especially for his sharing my enthusiasm for other great players such as Moyse, Dufrene & Crunelle".

Rampal's principal American students include concert and recording artist Robert Stallman and Ransom Wilson, who has followed in his mentor's footsteps as conductor as well as flautist.

== Personal life ==
Grave of Rampal in Montparnasse Cemetery

Rampal and his harpist wife Françoise, née Bacqueryrisse, (Note: Françoise is the daughter of harpist Odette Le Dentu.) were married on 7 June 1947. They made their home in Paris, living in the Avenue Mozart. They had two children, Isabelle and Jean-Jacques. Each year, they holidayed at their house on Corsica, where Jean-Pierre was able to indulge his passion for boating, fishing and photography. He was known for his love of food, and he maintained a personal rule wherever he went on tour that he would eat "only the cuisine of the country" he was in, looking forward to his post-concert dinners. He developed a particular fondness for Japanese cuisine, and in 1981 wrote an introduction to The Book of Sushi written by a chef and a master sushi teacher. Rampal's autobiography Music, My Love was published in 1989 by Random House.

== Honours ==
Rampal's honours include his Grand Prix du Disques from l'Académie Charles Cros which included awards for his recording of Vivaldi's Op. 10 flute concertos (1954), his recording of concertos by Benda and Richter (1955) with the Chamber Orchestra of Prague (Milan Munclinger), and in 1976 the Grand Prix ad honorem du Président de la République for his overall recording career to date. He also received the "Réalité" Oscar du Premier Virtuose Francais (1964), the Edison Prize; the Prix Mondial du Disque; the 1978 Leonie Sonning Prize (Denmark), the 1980 Prix d’Honneur of the 13th Montreux World Recording Prize for all his recordings; and the Lotos Club Medal of Merit for his lifetime's achievement. In 1988, he was created President d’honneur of the French Flute Association "La Traversière", while in 1991 the National Flute Association of America gave him its inaugural Lifetime Achievement award.

State honours included being made Chevalier de la Légion d’Honneur (1966) and Officier de la Légion d’Honneur (1979). He was also made a Commandeur de l’Ordre National du Mérite (1982) and Commandeur de l’Ordre des Arts et Lettres (1989). The City of Paris presented him with the Grande Médaille de la Ville Paris (1987), and in 1994 he received the Trophée des Arts from the Franco-American French Institute Alliance Française "for bridging French and American Cultures through his magnificent music". In 1994 the ambassador of Japan presented Rampal with the Order du Tréasor Sacre, the highest distinction presented by the Japanese government, in recognition of having inspired a new generation of aspiring flute-players in that country. While successful internationally, Rampal came to feel in later years that his reputation within his native France had diminished. It was "curious", he wrote in Le Monde in 1990, that no French music critics appeared to take any notice of his latest recordings: "Everything continues as if I didn't exist", he said; "This doesn't matter; I still play to full houses." After his death however, French public accolades celebrated his work.

The Jean-Pierre Rampal Flute Competition, begun in his honour in 1980 and open to flautists of all nationalities born after 8 November 1971, is held tri-annually as part of the Concours internationaux de la Ville de Paris.

In June 2005, the Association Jean-Pierre Rampal was founded in France to perpetuate the study and appreciation of Rampal's contribution to the art of flute-playing. Among other projects, which include maintaining the Jean-Pierre Rampal Archive, the association has collaborated in the re-release on the Premier Horizons label of a number of early Rampal performances on CD.

== Discography ==
Rampal recorded for a wide range of labels in Europe, America and Japan. In his autobiography (Music My Love, 1989) Rampal admitted that he himself found it difficult to keep track of the number of recordings he had made over his lifetime. In its obituary of Rampal (June Emerson, 24 May 2000), The Guardian said that Rampal “became one of the world's most recorded artists, with more than 400 records spanning the essential flute repertoire, quantities of new discoveries and first recordings of hitherto unknown works”. The New York Times obituary (Anthony Tommasini, 21 May 2000) agreed, pronouncing him “one of the most-recorded and best-selling classical instrumentalists in history.” Rampal's last record label, Sony Classical, described him as perhaps the world's single most-recorded classical musician of all.

Rampal's earliest recordings, 1946–1950, were on 78 rpm discs, many for the Parisian "Boite a Musique" label. With the opening of the 33 rpm LP era, he recorded for over 20 different labels between 1950 and 1970. Among the most significant of these was the French Erato label, founded in 1953, for whom he made approximately 100 recordings (several issued in the US on the RCA Red Seal label). In 1964, he recorded 17 albums, including three complete sets of flute pieces by Mozart, Handel, and Beethoven, in addition to concertos and other works. In 1978, with Ensemble Lunaire, he recorded Japanese Folk Melodies, which included three folk songs transcribed by Akio Yashiro but primarily featured music by late 19th and early 20th-century Japanese doyo composers: Tamezō Narita, Kōsaku Yamada, Megumi Ohnaka, Rentarō Taki, Ryūtarō Hirota, Kozaburo Hirai, Nagayo Motohori, and Shin Kusakawa, on CBS Records. In 1979, he signed an exclusive contract with the CBS label (later Sony Classical), and he made over 60 albums for them.

In the years following Rampal's death in 2000, many of his recordings spanning more than half a century were re-issued. Of particular note are the several collections produced by the recording companies he was most associated with.

Jean-Pierre Rampal: Le premier virtuose moderne was a compact disc set, issued in France in 2002 in collaboration with the Association Française de la Flûte, contains rare early performances from 78 rpm records made from 1946 to 1959. Charting the emergence of the young Rampal on record in the post-war years, this 3xCD Traversieres Flute Collection collection (Patrimoine, Vol.1) includes a set of five Bach Sonatas (BWV 1030, 1031, 1032, 1020, 1034 – recorded 1947–50); sonatas by Telemann (rec 1949) and Leclair (rec 1950); pieces by Couperin (rec 1950) and Haydn (rec 1950); a concerto for five flutes by Boismortier (rec 1949); a duet in G by Beethoven played with his father Joseph Rampal (rec 1951); and three Mozart quartets (KV 285, 285a and 285b – recorded 1946–50); alongside these are contemporary works by Roussel (rec 1950), Milhaud (rec 1949), Honegger (rec 1949), Dukas (rec 1950), Hindemith (rec 1950), Feld (rec 1959) and Francaix (rec 1955), and Rampal's earliest recording of Debussy's ‘Syrinx’ (rec 1949). The accompanying notes by Dennis Verroust of the French Flute Association, June 2002, reveal that in the 1949 Boismortier recording Rampal plays the third flute part alongside Fernand Dufrene, Robert Rochut, Alphonse Kenvyn and Georges Lussagnet. Rampal also wrote in ‘Music, My Love’ that the D major flute quartet (KV 285) by Mozart, with the Trio Pasquier in April 1946, was his first ever recording.

The Association Jean-Pierre Rampal has re-issued a number of early recordings (on the Premier Horizons label and elsewhere), including his 1954 recording of the concerto by Feld, and a range of recordings he made between 1954 and 1966 with orchestras conducted by Karl Ristenpart, with whom he closely collaborated. These include works by Vivaldi, Bach, Handel, Tartini, Mozart, Arma, and Jolivet.

In 2015, Jean-Pierre Rampal: The Complete Erato Recordings (3 vols) were reissued, containing material on the label for which he recorded extensively from the early 1950s to the early 1980s. These three volumes, comprising over 40 CDs (vo.1: 1954–63, vol.2: 1963–69, vol.3: 1970–82), stand alongside the Complete HMV Recordings (1951–76 on 12 CDs) also re-issued under the Erato label.

In 2017, the double CD Jean-Pierre Rampal in Prague: the Complete Supraphon Recordings was released, showcasing his collaboration in the mid-1950s with Czech conductor and flutist Milan Munclinger. It contains the first recordings of concertos by Benda, Richter, Stamitz and Feld, together with the Prokofiev sonata and other pieces.

In 2022, to mark the centenary of Rampal's birth, Sony Classical, in collaboration with Association Jean-Pierre Rampal, issued its collection Jean-Pierre Rampal: The Complete CBS Masterworks Recordings. Across 56 CDs, this box-set features recordings that Rampal made through the second half of his career, between 1969 and 1996, a period that saw his recording interests transferred to the American company CBS after his earlier and lengthy partnership with the French label Erato. Although the bulk of the CBS recordings are from the classical repertoire, there are also several cross-over albums (e.g. music by Bolling, Gershwin, Joplin, etc). Among many highlights, the collection charts Rampal's collaboration with American pianist John Steele Ritter, who in the late 1970s took over as his principal accompanist once illness had caused long-time recital partner Robert Veyron Lacroix to step back from touring.

== TV and DVD ==
Rampal made a number of television concert appearances in France from the late 1950s onwards, and later elsewhere—especially in America and Japan, where his reputation and following remained highest. As the first televised flute-player of any age, the medium contributed to his worldwide popularity in the decades after World War II:

Jean-Pierre Rampal
EMI "Classic Archive" DVB 51089991; released 2007 in collaboration with the Association Jean-Pierre Rampal
This presents a collection of fine early performances filmed for French TV between 1958 and 1965 and still held in the Institut National de l'Audiovisuel, the national French television archive. The earliest footage was broadcast on 17 March 1958, in the musical TV series Les Grandes Interprètes, soon after Rampal had returned from his successful debut tour of the US.
He begins with Handel's Sonata in F (HWV.369), then plays Debussy's The Little Shepherd and Ravel's Pièce en forme de habanera, both transcribed for flute and piano; and also Jolivet's Incantation C for unaccompanied flute. For the Handel, Debussy, and Ravel pieces, he is accompanied by the programme's presenter, pianist Bernard Gavoty. After a performance of Vivaldi's La Notte concerto in G minor RV 439 with the Collegium Musicum de Paris (broadcast 8 October 1963) comes a rendition of J.S. Bach's Suite in C minor BWV 997 (Paris, 16 April 1963) and the opening Allegro from Bach's Sonata in G minor BWV 1020 (Paris, broadcast 28 December 1964), both with Veyron-Lacroix at the harpsichord. More of this duo in recital at the Salle Gaveau in Paris (19 March 1964) appears from the TV series the Jeunesses musicales de France, featuring Couperin's Concert Royal No. 4, parts of J. S. Bach's Partita in A minor for solo flute and a sonata in B flat, K.15, by Mozart. The two concerto performances that complete the collection, both with the Orchestre Philharmonique de l'ORTF conducted by Rampal's long-time collaborator Louis de Froment, are of Mozart's Concerto No. 1 in G, K.313 (Paris, 5 May 1965), and the Ibert flute concerto (Paris, 8 April 1962). Of the Mozart concertos, Rampal said in a BBC Radio 4 interview that he did not like his 1966 recording with the Vienna Symphony Orchestra for ERATO because his playing was adversely affected by the uncomfortably high orchestral pitch insisted upon in Vienna. By contrast, he said he preferred his 1978 recording with the ‘Israel Symphony Orchestra’, even though it does not compare particularly well with the earlier TV performance.
Francis Poulenc and Friends
EMI 'Classic Archive' DVB 3102019
Rampal, playing the Poulenc flute sonata, is featured twice in this compilation, once with Poulenc himself in 1959 and again after the composer's death in 1963. The initial footage, preserved in the national French TV archive, is of a televised concert given by Poulenc in Paris at the Salle Gaveau in 1959. After a brief interview with the composer, Poulenc is joined on set by Rampal to perform the slow Cantilena from the flute Sonata. Rampal is seen again later in footage from a TV broadcast in which he plays the complete Flute Sonata, this time accompanied by Veyron-Lacroix. Additional performances of Poulenc's music are provided by artists including pianist Jacques Février, cellist Maurice Gendron, baritone Gabriel Bacquier, organist Jean-Jacques Grunenwald, soprano Denise Duval and others, together with the ORTF National Orchestra conducted by Georges Prêtre.
The Art of Jean-Pierre Rampal 1956–1966
Video Artists International
This is a two-volume DVD compilation featuring a series of Radio-Canada "Telecasts", broadcast and recorded during the years when Rampal was at the peak of his fame. In this rare footage, retrieved from the archives of CBC Montreal, Rampal is accompanied by Veyron-Lacroix and the McGill Chamber Orchestra, conducted by Alexander Brott. The first volume of this set of live broadcasts includes: Boccherini's Concerto for Flute and Orchestra in D major (broadcast 1 March 1956); Haydn's Concerto for flute, harpsichord and string orchestra in F major, with Debussy's Syrinx for unaccompanied flute (broadcast 28 March 1957); Couperin's Concert Royal IV, with J. S. Bach's Sonata for flute and harpsichord in G minor, BWV 1020 (broadcast 27 December 1961). Volume two features Mozart's Flute Concerto No. 2 in D major, K.314, together with the Flute Concerto No. 1 in G major, K.313 (broadcast 24 February 1966).
Bolling: Suite for Flute and Jazz Piano
This features a live televised performance from 1976 of Claude Bolling's cross-over Suite (1973), written for Jean-Pierre Rampal (who plays a classical line to Bolling's jazz piano) and which by then had become a runaway success in the Billboard charts. Special guest double-bass player Max Hediguer is also featured.

== Radio ==
Apart from the many French Radio broadcasts of performances by Rampal, BBC Radio 4 broadcast a 45-minute profile, Rampal–"Prince of Flute Players", on 11 October 1983 in the 20:20–21:05 documentary slot. It contained extracts from an interview with Rampal himself, rare for the fact that Rampal gave very few interviews of any length in English. Rampal talks about his life and times and his approach to music-making. Also featured are interviews with English flautist William Bennett, American flautist and Rampal's sometime-pupil Elena Duran, and violinist Isaac Stern, who was Rampal's long-time friend and musical collaborator. The programme is kept in the BBC Sound Archive, together with the two unedited original interviews with Rampal that it draws on (both recorded by BBC producer Peter Griffiths in London, in January 1981 and November 1982, at the Westbury Hotel, Conduit Street, off Regent Street, where Rampal normally stayed in London).

== Films ==
L. Subramaniam: Violin From the Heart (1999), directed by Jean Henri Meunier, includes a scene of Rampal performing with L. Subramaniam.

Rampal also makes an appearance in the 1977 educational film The Joy of Bach, playing his flute on a rooftop in France.

== Cited sources ==
- Dorgeuille, Claude (1986). The French Flute School, 1860–1950. Trans. Edward Blakeman. Tony Bingham. p. 26. ISBN 978-0-946113-02-6.
- Verroust, Denis, Jean-Pierre Rampal: Le premier virtuose moderne (CD liner), Jean-Pierre Rampal, Traversiere, 210/271-272-273
