= Sakunosuke Koyama =

Japanese composer and musicologist (1864–1927)

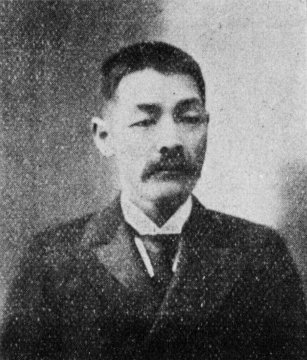
- Born: 19 January 1864
- Died: 27 June 1927 (aged 63)
- Occupations: Composer, educator

Sakunosuke Koyama (19 January 1864 – 27 June 1927) was a Japanese composer and music teacher. He was the founder and president of the Japanese Music Education Federation.

== Biography ==
Koyama left for Tokyo in 1880 without permission from his family and began studying English, mathematics and music at the University of Tsukiji. After obtaining his diplomas, he was appointed by the Ministry of Education as a researcher and teacher at a Music Research Center, which later changed to the Tokyo Music School. In the Ministry of Education, he was Izawa Shuji (1851–1917), the leader of the music research department, who within the so-called Dutch studies, Western natural sciences and had studied technology.

In addition to his work at this institution, he composed and published a collection of folk songs. In 1897, he was appointed professor. Although he continued to support and guide his students, he left this institution in 1903. He mainly wrote school songs, which helped him to familiarize students with European music. Some songs also made Koyama known outside of Japan, particularly in China, which had begun to incorporate European music into the education system after the defeat in the First Sino-Japanese War (1894–1895).

In 1904, he was appointed advisor and consultant to the musical instruments factory, Yamaha Corporation. During this period he strongly influenced music life, especially through the establishment of various music schools and other institutions and organizations. He was also the founder and first director of the Japanese Federation of Music Educators and first president of the Federation of Japanese Music.

== Compositions ==
=== Works for concert band ===
- "Teki wa ikuman" ("No matter how many enemies are out there", 1891)
- 1904: Nippon Kaigun (Japanese Navy) – text: Takeki Owada
- Lieutenant Colonel Hirose – text: Sazanami Iwaya
- Natsu wa Kinu (Summer has come)

=== Vocal music ===
- 1896: Natsu wa kinu (夏は来ぬ; Summer has come); song selected for Nihon no Uta Hyakusen (No. 71)
- 1901: Juon shokashu ni, collection of chorals

=== Works for piano ===
- Natsu wa Kinu (Summer has come)
