= Ryūtarō Hirota =

Japanese composer

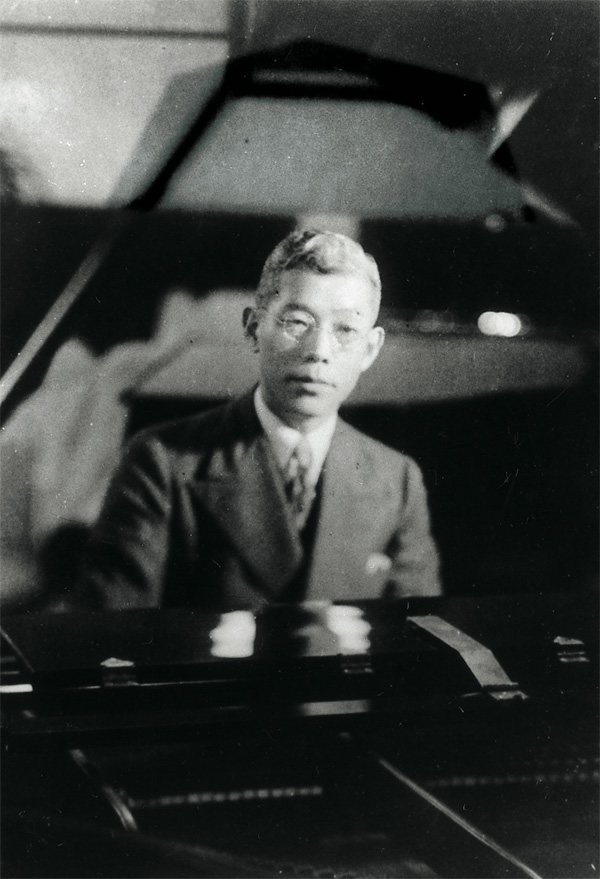
Image of Hirota Ryūtarō

Ryūtarō Hirota (弘田 龍太郎, Hirota Ryūtarō; 30 June 1892 – 17 November 1952) was a Japanese composer.

Hirota was born in Aki, Kōchi.

== Works, editions and recordings ==
- Komoro-naru kojo no hotori (小諸なる古城のほとり "In the old castle in Komoro") Recording Kazumichi Ohno (tenor), Kyosuke Kobayashi (piano)
- "Hamachidori" (Beach Plover). Jean-Pierre Rampal (flute), Ensemble Lunaire. Japanese Folk Melodies transcribed by Akio Yashiro, CBS Records, 1978.
