= Nanatsu no Ko =

"七つの子"

Song
- Language: Japanese
- English title: "Nanatsu no Ko"
- Published: July 1921
- Genre: Children's song
- Composer: Nagayo Motoori
- Lyricist: Ujō Noguchi

Nanatsu no Ko (七つの子, lit. Seven children, or Seven baby crows, The crow's seven chicks) is a popular Japanese children's song with lyrics written by Ujō Noguchi (野口雨情 Noguchi Ujō) and composed by Nagayo Motoori (本居 長世 Motoori Nagayo). Originally published in the magazine 黄金の船 ("The Golden Boat") in July 1921, Nanatsu no Ko is used as the departure melody at Isohara Station in Kitaibaraki, as well as the 6 p.m. bell in Japan Advanced Institute of Science and Technology at Nomi, Ishikawa.

== Lyrics ==
Japanese	Romanization	English translation
烏 なぜ啼くの 烏は山に 可愛い七つの 子があるからよ 可愛 可愛と 烏は啼くの 可愛 可愛と 啼くんだよ 山の古巣へ 行って見て御覧 丸い眼をした いい子だよ	Karasu naze nakuno Karasu wa yama ni Kawaii nanatsu no Ko ga aru kara yo Kawaii kawaii to Karasu wa nakuno Kawaii kawaii to Nakundayo Yama no fuurusu e Itte mite goran Marui me o shita Iiko da yo	Mother crow, why do you squawk so? Because high on the mountain I have seven cute children. "Cute, cute," This mother crow sings. "Cute, cute," Cries the mother crow. You should behold the old nest On the mountain. And there you'll see such Round-eyed, good children.

== In popular culture ==
The song is sung by a nondiegetic children's choir in the 1954 Kinoshita Keisuke film Twenty-Four Eyes.

In the manga and anime Detective Conan by Gosho Aoyama, the mail address of the boss of the Black Organization is #969#6261, which reproduces the beginning of Nanatsu no Ko.

The song is sung in the anime Magical Girl Ore episode 10 by Mohiro to console a lost child.
