= Hashimoto Kunihiko =

Japanese musician (1904–1949)

Hashimoto Kunihiko 橋本國彦
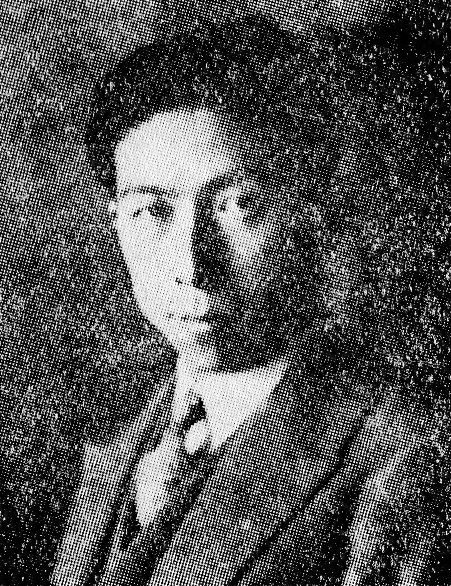

Background information
- Also known as: Ashikaga Ryūnosuke
- Born: September 14, 1904; Hongō Ward, Tokyo, Empire of Japan
- Died: May 6, 1949 (aged 44) Kamakura, Kanagawa Prefecture, Japan
- Occupations: composer, conductor, violinist, educator

Hashimoto Kunihiko (橋本國彦; also Qunihico Hashimoto) (September 14, 1904 – May 6, 1949) was a Japanese composer, violinist, conductor, and musical educator.

== Biography ==
Hashimoto was born in the Hongō district of Tokyo. In 1923, he entered the Tokyo Music School (presently Tokyo National University of Fine Arts and Music) where he studied violin and conducting. In composition, he was largely self-taught, but later he would study that subject as a graduate student at the same school. Initially, he was active as a composer and arranger, but he soon made himself a name as an accomplished teacher, and in 1933 was appointed as professor at his alma mater. Some of his students who would go on to become distinguished composers in their own right were Akio Yashiro, Yasushi Akutagawa, Ikuma Dan, and Toshiro Mayuzumi.

Between 1934 and 1937, he visited Wien as a Japanese government scholar to study with Egon Wellesz. During this period, he was introduced to the likes of Alban Berg, Wilhelm Furtwängler, and Bruno Walter. Before returning, he also made a sojourn to Los Angeles, where he studied with Arnold Schoenberg.

In February 1949, Hashimoto converted to Catholicism. He died at age 44 on May 6, 1949, in Kamakura from gastric cancer.

== List of works ==
=== Orchestral ===
- Three Characteristic Dances for Strings (1927)
- Scherzo con sentimento (1927/28)
- Symphony No. 1 in D (1940)
- Symphony No. 2 in F (1947)

=== Ballet ===
- Hydrangea Otaxa (1927)
- Yaya the Witch (1927)
- Yoshida Palace (1931)
- Heavenly Maiden and Fisherman (1932)

=== Chamber ===
- Etude for Violin and Cello (1930)

=== Choral ===
- Celebrating the Birth of the Prince, Cantata (1934)

=== Vocal ===
- Mould (黴, Kabi) for voice and piano (1928); words by Sumako Fukao (深尾須磨子)
- Tiger Beetle (斑猫, Hanmyo) for voice and piano (1928); words by Sumako Fukao (深尾須磨子)
- Cakes and a Girl (お菓子と娘, Okashi-to-Musume) for voice and piano (1928); words by Yaso Saijō (西條八十)
- Looking at Mount Fuji (富士山見たら, Fujisan-Mitara) for voice and piano (1929); words by Shōji Kubota (久保田宵二)
- Dance (舞, Mai) for voice and piano (1929); words by Sumako Fukao (深尾須磨子)
- Rice Planting Song (田植唄, Taue-Uta) for voice and piano (1930); words by Ryuha Hayashi (林柳波)
- Winter Suite for solo voice and chamber ensemble (1945); words by Sumako Fukao (深尾須磨子)
- Three Wasan (Three Prayers of Japanese Buddhists) (三つの和讃, Mittsu no Wasan) for solo voice and orchestra (1948)
