= Kozaburo Hirai =

Japanese composer (1910–2002)

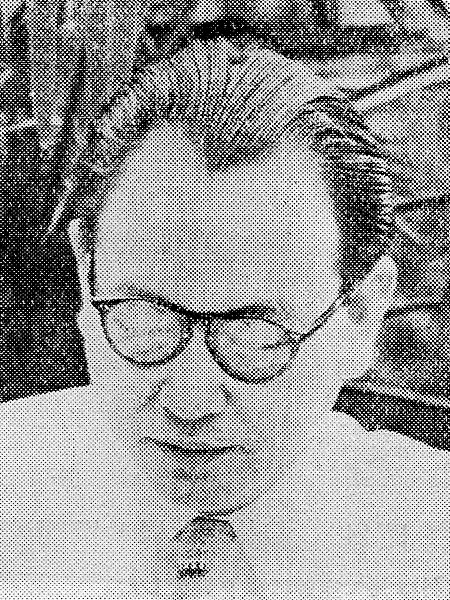
- Born: 10 September 1910; Kochi
- Died: 30 November 2002 (aged 92)
- Other name: 平井 康三郎、平井 保喜
- Occupation: Composer
- Children: Jyoichiro Hirai (cellist); Takejiro Hirai (pianist)

Kozaburo Hirai (平井 康三郎, Hirai Kōzaburō; 10 September 1910 – 30 November 2002) was a Japanese composer and professor of music. He was the father of pianist, composer and musicologist Takejiro Hirai and cellist Jyoichiro Hirai.

== Works, editions and recordings ==
- Idyl for clarinet 1941
- Song Nara-yama (平城山, Nara mountain), recorded by Jean-Pierre Rampal (flute) and Ensemble Lunaire. Japanese Folk Melodies transcribed by Akio Yashiro. CBS Records, 1978.
- Song Yuri-kago (ゆりかご, the rocking cradle)
