= Nagayo Motoori =

Japanese composer

Motoori Nagayo
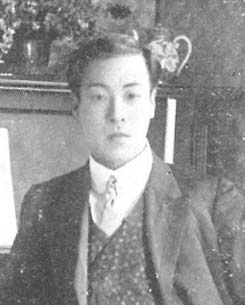
- Born: 4 April 1885; Tokyo, Japan
- Died: 14 October 1945 (aged 60)
- Other name: 本居 長世
- Occupation: composer

Nagayo Motoori (sometimes spelled Motohori) (本居 長世; 4 April 1885 – 14 October 1945) was a Japanese composer.

== Selected works ==
- "Tanpopo" (Dandelion, たんぽぽ), classical children's song to a poem by Shigeru Kuzuhara
- "Akai Kutsu", children's song with lyrics by Ujō Noguchi
- Aoi me no ningyō (Blue-eyed doll), children's song with lyrics by Ujō Noguchi
- Kisha Poppo, children's song with lyrics also by Motoori
- Nanatsu no Ko, children's song with lyrics by Ujō Noguchi, recorded by Jean-Pierre Rampal and Ensemble Lunaire in 1978
