= Teiichi Okano =

Japanese composer

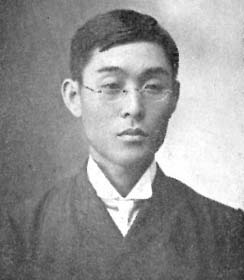
Teiichi Okano (1878-1941)

Teiichi Okano (Japanese: 岡野貞一 Okano Teiichi; 16 February 1878, Tottori, Tottori, Japan – 29 December 1941) was a Japanese composer.

== Selected works ==
Popular songs

- "Furusato" (故郷) (1914)
- "Haru ga kita" (春が来た) (1910)
- "Haru no ogawa" (春の小川) (1912)
- "Hinomaru no hata" (日の丸の旗) (1911)
- "Momiji" (もみじ) (1911)
- "Oborozuki yo" (朧月夜; "Dark Moon Night") for soprano, flute and harp (1914)
- Momotarō's song (1911)

== Oborozuki yo ==
Oborozuki yo (朧月夜; "Dark Moon Night") is a song composed by Teiichi Okano with lyrics by Tatsuyuki Takano. The song was written to pass down the Japanese landscape to posterity. In 1914, the song appeared in the list of "Jinjo Elementary School Songs for 6th-grade," to be taught in the Japanese public school system. It is still sung to this day.

=== Japanese ===
1．

菜の花畠に、入日薄れ、

見わたす山の端、霞ふかし。

春風そよふく、空を見れば、

夕月かかりて、にほひ淡し。

2．

里わの火影も、森の色も、

田中の小路をたどる人も、

蛙のなくねも、かねの音も、

さながら霞める 朧月夜。

=== Translation ===
1.

Evening sun goes down in a mustard field.

When I look out over mountain ridges, they are veiled in dense mist.

I feel the spring breeze and I look up at the sky.

Then, the evening moon rises high and it is colored softly.

2.

The lamps of a village, green of the forest,

people who walk along a path between rice paddies,

croaking of a frog and the sound of a temple bell

everything is shrouded in mist on a hazy moonlit night.
