= Shin Kusakawa =

Japanese composer

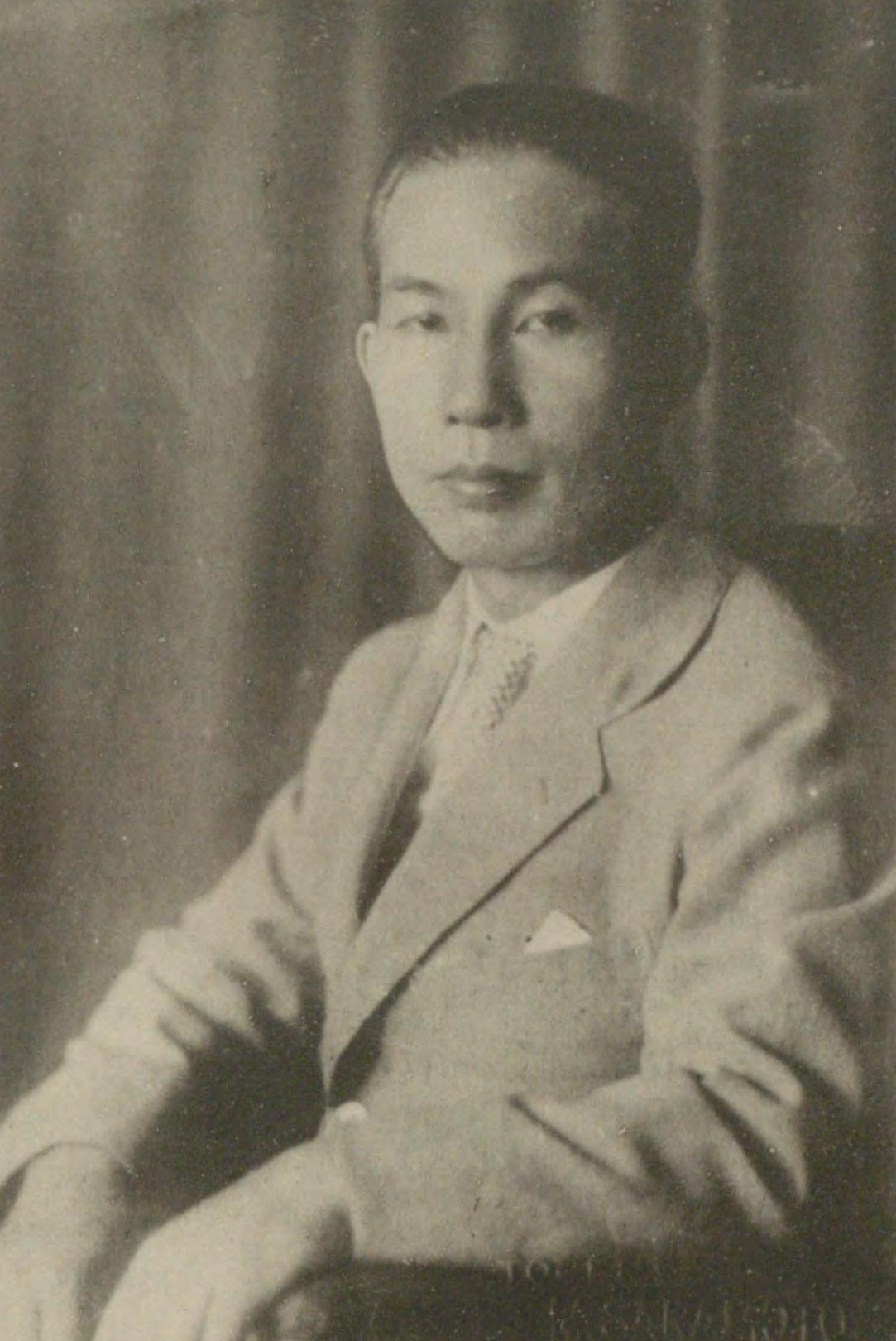
Image of Shin Kusakawa

Shin Kusakawa (草川 信 (くさかわ しん)) (February 14, 1893, Nagano, Nagano, Japan - September 20, 1948) was a Japanese composer famous for his doyo, "夕やけこやけ (Yūyake koya ke)"/"Sunset Glow."

His eldest son, Hiroshi, was killed in World War II. He was also a composer, and his works were discovered and performed in 2017.

== Partial Discography ==
- "Sunset" Werner Müller And His Orchestra - Cherry Blossom Time In Japan. Decca Records, 1957
- "Yuyake Koyake" (Evening Glow) on Jean Pierre Rampal, Ensemble Lunaire, Japanese Folk Melodies transcribed by Akio Yashio. CBS Records, 1978.
- Jojou Danshou Akira Kamiya~Seishun no Monologue CQ-7030 (September 1979)
- 夕やけこやけ (Yūyake koya ke) "Sunset" Columbia String Orchestra, Yasuo Minami Japanese Favourite Melodies. Denon 35C32-7277, 1984]]
- Omoide no Douyou Meikyokushuu Mikan no Hanasaku Oka / Masako Kawada 30CC-2190 (March 21, 1988)
- Project A-ko Original Song Book D30G-0080 (October 21, 1988)
- Project A-ko Original Song Book X25X-1009 (October 21, 1988)
- Oriental Green / Eri Kawai DDCZ-1625 (August 26, 2009)
- Shimamura-san and bermei.inazawa: Bokura no Ongaku - Lonesome Life CPNL-0016/OEMM-0202 (December 31, 2019)
- Summer Pockets REFLECTION BLUE Opening Theme: ASTER LORE KSLA-0168 (April 30, 2020)
