= Shigeru Kuzuhara =

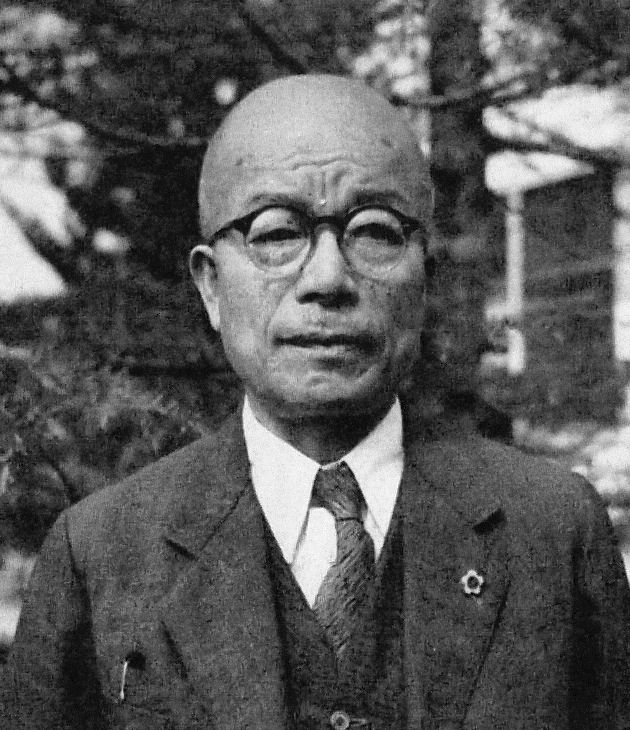
- Kuzuhara in 1956
- Born: July 25, 1886; Fukuyama, Hiroshima Prefecture, Japan
- Died: December 7, 1961 (aged 75)
- Occupations: Poet, songwriter, fabulist, educator

Shigeru Kuzuhara (葛原 しげる, Kuzuhara Shigeru; Fukuyama, Hiroshima June 25, 1886 – December 7, 1961) was a Japanese children's poet, children's song writer, fairy tale writer, and educator.

Kuzuhara wrote 4000 nursery songs, stories and other works. Two of his songs are in the Nihon no Uta Hyakusen compendium by the Ministry of Education of Japan. Other songs include the national song of the Boy Scouts of Japan (1957), Hiroshima High School, and about 400 school songs throughout Japan. Every December 7 a local ceremony is held in front of his birthplace by the "Kuzuhara Culture Preservation Association".

== Notes ==
The kanji for "Shigeru" is 𦱳. However, because it is a rarely used kanji, "Shigeru" is most often expressed in hiragana.
