= Akai Kutsu =

1922 Japanese children's poem by Ujō Noguchi

Akai Kutsu (赤い靴, lit. "Red Shoes") is a well-known Japanese children's poem written in 1922 by poet Ujō Noguchi. It is also famous as a Japanese folk song for children, with music composed by Nagayo Motoori. The poem narrates the story of a girl who is adopted by foreigners and taken to the United States.

== Lyrics ==
赤い靴（くつ） 履いてた 女の子 異人（いじん）さんに 連れられて 行っちゃった

横浜の 埠頭（はとば）から 汽船（ふね）に乗って 異人さんに 連れられて 行っちゃった

今では 青い目に なっちゃって 異人さんの お国に いるんだろう

赤い靴 見るたび 考える 異人さんに 逢（あ）うたび 考える

Translation:

A young girl with red shoes
was taken away by a foreigner.

She rode on a ship from Yokohama pier
taken away by a foreigner

I imagine right now she has become blue-eyed
living in that foreigner’s land.

Every time I see red shoes, I think of her
And every time I meet a foreigner, I think of her.

Evidence suggests that in the original manuscript of Akai Kutsu, the line read "Every time I see red shoes, I remember her," but it was later changed to "think of."

Originally unreleased, a fifth stanza was discovered in notes released in 1978.

生まれた 日本が 恋しくば
青い海眺めて ゐるんだらう（いるんだろう）
異人さんに たのんで 帰って来（こ）

Translation:

When she misses Japan where she was born
I imagine she stares at the blue sea
and asks the foreigner if she can go home

== Established origin theory ==
The established theory is that the lyrics of Akai Kutsu were inspired by a true story. It is believed that Iwasaki Kimi (July 15, 1902 - September 15, 1911), a young girl from Fushimi, Shizuoka Prefecture, served as the model for the girl wearing red shoes in the poem.

Kimi's mother, Kayo Iwasaki, initially raised her as a single mother but eventually moved to Hokkaido and married Shirou Suzuki. When Kimi was three years old, her parents joined a communal farm in Hokkaido associated with the Socialist movement. Due to the harsh farming conditions, Kayo, with the help of her father-in-law, Sano Yasuyoshi, entrusted Kimi's upbringing to a pair of American missionaries named Hewitt.

The Hewitts eventually decided to return to America, but Kimi contracted tuberculosis, which was incurable at the time, preventing them from taking her with them. They entrusted her to an orphanage at Toriikazu Church in Azabu, Tokyo, and returned to America without her. Kimi died at the orphanage at the age of nine, never reuniting with her mother. Kayo, unaware of Kimi's fate, spent her life believing that Kimi had gone to America with the Hewitts, not knowing that she had died of tuberculosis in Tokyo.

In 1907, Ujō Noguchi, a socialist poet since 1903, became close to his coworker Suzuki Shirou and his wife Kayo while working at a newspaper in Sapporo. During this time, he heard Kayo's account of how Kimi had been taken to America by missionaries. Unbeknownst to Kayo, Kimi was actually in an orphanage in Tokyo. Discouraged by the farming lifestyle, the Suzukis had confided their story to Noguchi. Inspired by this tale, Noguchi wrote Akai Kutsu in 1921, and it became a nursery rhyme in 1922 with music composed by Nagayo Motoori.

In 1973, Kimi's half-sister, Sono (Shirou and Kayo's third daughter), wrote to a newspaper claiming, "My sister is the girl from Akai Kutsu." This prompted Hiroshi Kikuchi, a reporter for Hokkaido Television Broadcasting, to investigate the story. After five years of research, Kikuchi confirmed the account. In 1978, a documentary titled Document: The Girl in the Red Shoes aired on HKB, followed by Kikuchi's non-fiction book The Girl in The Red Shoes. This book's narrative became the widely accepted theory on the matter.

=== Arguments against the established theory ===
The idea that the established theory is partially based on fabrications was advocated by the author Shousuke Ai. When the Mother and Child Statue was erected in Nihondaira, Shizuoka, in 1986, Ai was asked to write a script for a commemorative special by the local TV station SBS, titled The Wandering Poem: The Girl in the Red Shoes. However, Ai had doubts about the accuracy of the established theory presented in Kikuchi's book and the documentary Document: The Girl in the Red Shoes. He decided to investigate the contradictions in the theory. In his book Hoax: The Unworn Red Shoes, Ai clarified his position that the established theory lacked a factual basis.

Shousuke Ai's theory presents several challenges to the established narrative:

1. The assertion in Kikuchi's book that Sano was Kimi's biological father lacks evidence. It is more plausible that Kimi being listed as Sano's adopted daughter in the family register was a measure to place an illegitimate child in her grandfather's family register.
2. While the missionaries' surname "Hewitt" is accurate, the claim that they had contact with Kimi is unfounded. The story that Kimi was entrusted to the missionary couple was likely a fabrication by Sano to comfort Kayo. In reality, Sano placed Kimi directly into an orphanage in Tokyo, where she remained. During this period, the Hewitts were in Hokkaido and could not have adopted Kimi
3. Kikuchi's book suggests that Ujō Noguchi turned Kayo's story of Kimi's adoption into a poem. However, Kayo likely had few opportunities to meet and converse with the Noguchis, and it is improbable she would have discussed her illegitimate child. The relationship between the Noguchis and Suzukis probably did not extend beyond professional and political discussions.
4. Ujō Noguchi's Akai Kutsu should be interpreted as a metaphor for the disillusionment with the Utopian Socialist movement, rather than a literal recounting of Kimi's story.

Ai argues that Kikuchi supplemented gaps in his research with imaginative details, while Kikuchi maintains that there are no errors in the foundation of his theory.

Ai insists, based on the research of Ujō's son Noguchi Nobuya, that "Ujō's nursery rhymes, of which "Akai Kutsu" is included, are not about any particular person." Conversely, Kukichi argues that Akai Kutsu and some of Ujō's other works do refer to particular individuals. The two also differ in their interpretation of Shabondama, where the line "So soon after it was born, it broke and was no more" may express Ujō's grief over the premature death of his eldest daughter.

On August 21, 2009, the statue Kimi-chan was erected in Hakodate, Hokkaido, based on the established theory. However, a newspaper article in the Mainichi Shimbun discussing the statue's installation indicated the existence of multiple interpretations of the poem, one being that it was written about "the setbacks of the Utopian Socialist movement that was based around Shūsui Kōtoku who had led the development of peasant farming" and remarked how "relatives of Noguchi assert that 'there was no real-life model (for the girl in the song).'"

Ujō's granddaughter, Fujiko, representing the Ujō Noguchi Memorial Hall, asserted in a speech that Shabondama reflects his grief over the untimely passing of his daughter. However, there is a discrepancy between Nobuya and Fujiko regarding their stance on the official theory; while Nobuya consistently opposes it, Fujiko delivered a commemorative speech during the unveiling of the Kimi-chan statue.

However, Nobuya also posits that Mokichi Noguchi (Ujō's younger cousin), a staunch adherent of Sen Katayama's socialist ideology, exerted significant influence on Ujō's early poems, particularly those that were not nursery rhymes.

In her recent work A Poet of Nostalgia and a Childlike Heart: The Ujō Noguchi Story, Fujiko Noguchi writes that it's plausible to interpret the fourth stanza in Akai Kutsu as referring to Mokichi (who emigrated to America from Yokohama in 1905 and died in Los Angeles in 1954). Regarding the established theory, she suggests that while there is no direct evidence, it's reasonable to assume that some personal experience of Ujō's served as inspiration for Akai Kutsu. Fujiko does not address Ai's theory in the book.

== Other debates ==
Even before the publication of Hoax: The Unworn Red Shoes, varying interpretations of this nursery rhyme were already a topic of discussion. In 2003, on NHK Educational TV's educational program A Course About Humans, as part of a series titled Why Do People Sing?, Rokusuke Ei mentioned that he had heard from Fujiko Noguchi that "The 'Aka' (red) in 'Akai Kutsu' ('Red Shoes') refers to the Soviet Union, and Ujō was expressing 'where has the Soviet Union and Socialism gone?' However, to circumvent potential censorship under the Peace Preservation Law, he employed metaphorical language."

In an article in the June 17, 2003 issue of Weekly Shinchou, Fujiko Noguchi contested this assertion, stating, "I never spoke to Ei about Ujō's nursery rhymes." This disagreement has caused a division between her and Ei, who maintains that he heard the information from her. Additionally, the article included remarks from Hiroshi Eguchi, who pointed out Ei's misunderstanding by noting that "the Peace Preservation Law wasn't established until years after the release of Akai Kutsu." Composer Koichi Sugiyama also criticized Ei, suggesting that "He is misinterpreting Ujō's masterpiece as something anti-Japanese."

In the same article, former chairman of the Ujō Council and Ujō researcher Masako Saijou cited the established theory that Ujō derived the poem from a story he heard from Suzuki Shirou. She also cast doubt on Ei's interpretation of the color red as symbolic of the Soviet Union.

In the conclusion, the reporter cites Ujō's statement that "it is not acceptable to critique a nursery rhyme's lyrics using logic," to dismiss Rokosuke Ei's attempt to assert that "no matter the author's feelings, a song is something that is influenced by the ideas of those that come after."

The article omits any reference to Ujō's publication as a Socialist poet or Shirou Suzuki's involvement in peasant farming. Additionally, it does not delve into the ongoing debate regarding whether Ujō's shift in literary style later in life stemmed from a genuine change in his beliefs regarding Socialism or if it was merely a superficial alteration while maintaining his Socialist principles.

In December 2009, guest Tomoko Matsushima presented the established theory on TBS Radio's "Saturday Wide Radio Tokyo: Rokosuke Ei and the New World" (土曜ワイドラジオTOKYO 永六輔その新世界) program.

== Statues ==
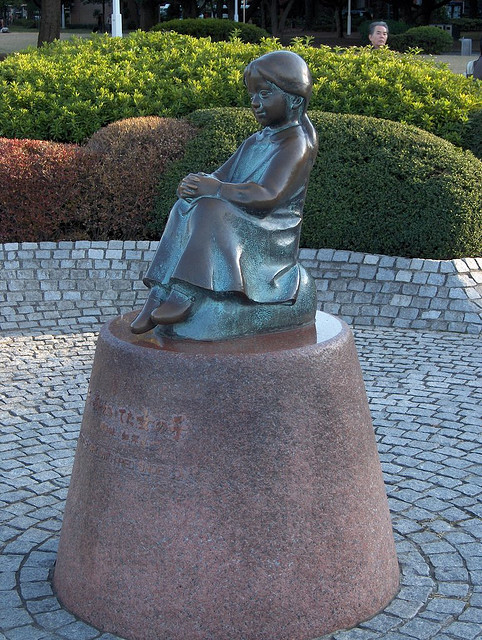
A statue dedicated to Iwasaki Kimi, the little girl in the song.

In 1979, Yamashita Park in Yokohama saw the erection of the statue "The Girl in the Red Shoes." This statue, reflecting the innocent imagery of Ujō's poem, was a gift from the Council of Citizens who Love Akai Kutsu, later renamed the Akai Kutsu Commemoration Cultural Foundation. In 1982, the Council donated a miniature version of the statue to Yokohama Station. Initially, the statue was located at the south entrance, but in December 2010, it was relocated to a more accessible location for free passage.

In 2009, a replica of the statue from Yamashita Park was erected in Yokohama's sister city of San Diego, California, near the beach. The replica was unveiled on June 27th.

The following six statues were erected based on the established theory:

- Shizuoka Prefecture, Nihondaira - "Mother and Daughter Statue" (1986)
- Tokyo, Azabu-Jūban - "Statue of Kimi-chan" (1989)
- Hokkaido, Rusutsu - "Mother's Feelings" (1991)
- Hokkaido, Otaru - "Akai Kutsu: Parents and Child Statue" (2007)
- Hokkaido, Hakodate - "Statue of Kimi-chan" (2009)
- Aomori Prefecture, Ajigasawa - "Akai Kutsu Statue" (2010)

On September 4, 2012, during NHK Radio 2's program "Basic English 3," guest Dario Toda mentioned that a statue is in the process of being sculpted, with his sister serving as the model.

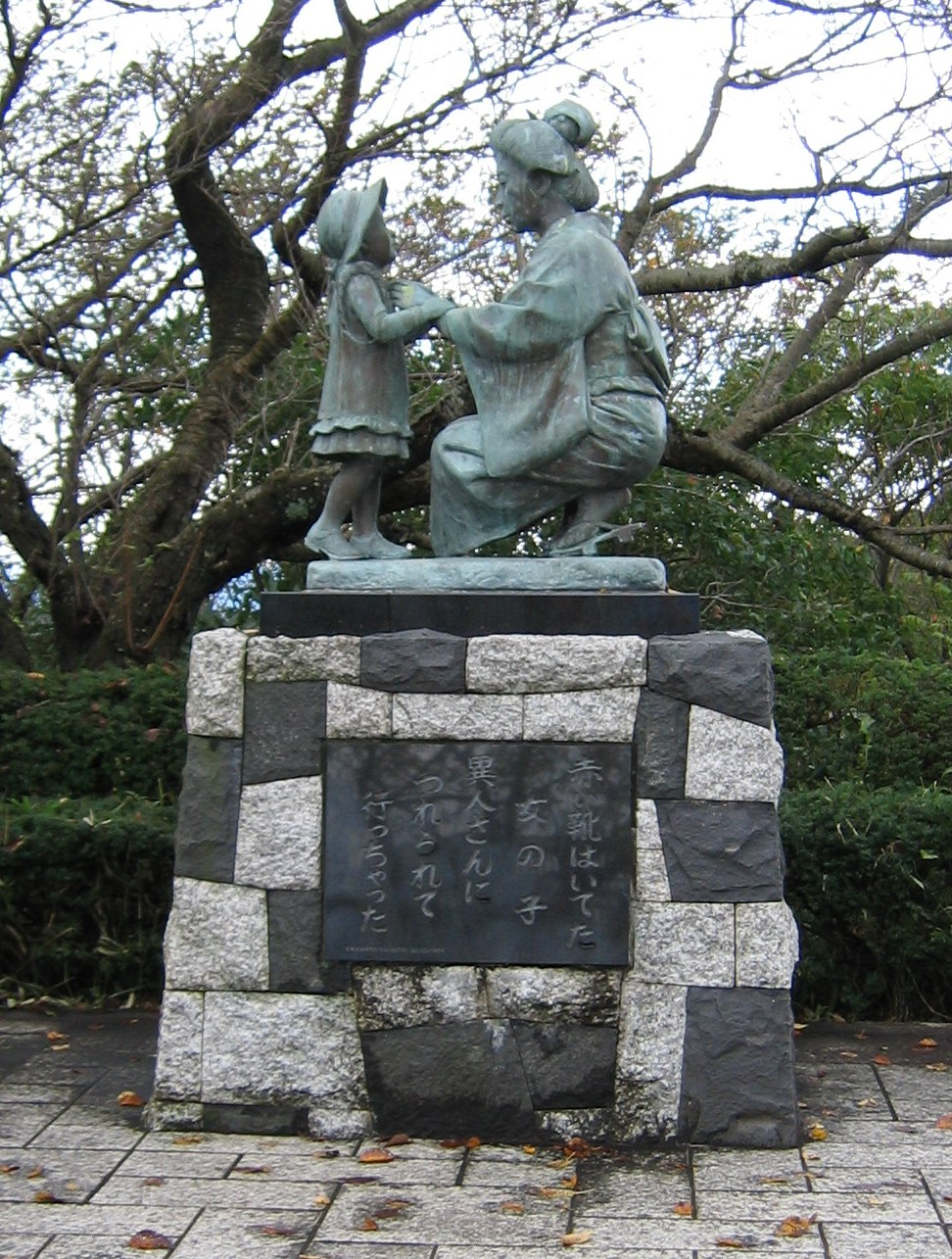
"Girl in red shoes" statue in Shizuoka prefecture.
