= Greg Irwin =

American actor

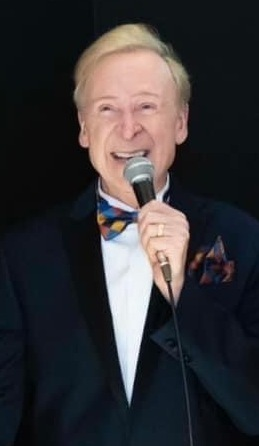
- Born: Eau Claire, Wisconsin, U.S.
- Education: University of Hawaiʻi
- Occupations: Master of ceremonies, voice actor, singer
- Years active: 1993–present

Greg Irwin is an American-born singer, voice actor, and bilingual master of ceremonies (MC) based in Japan. He is best known for his English adaptations of Japanese dōyō (children’s songs), extensive voice-over work in Japan, and appearances as a host for high-profile international events and wedding receptions.

== Early life ==
Born and raised in Wisconsin, Irwin studied music at the University of Wisconsin–Eau Claire and theater at the University of Minnesota. During university, he moved to Hawaii his senior year and worked as a performer on American Hawaii Cruises.

Encouraged to visit Japan, Irwin participated in a homestay program and worked at Tokyo Disneyland. Upon returning to Hawaii, he enrolled in the Japanese Language Department at the University of Hawaiʻi and worked as a DJ for KOHO-FM radio station.

After returning to Japan, he was invited to translate Japanese dōyō songs into English. After recording twenty songs, a producer told him that he had found his “life’s work.” The Tokyo Shimbun called him “The messenger of Japanese Children’s Songs.”

== Career ==
Irwin has published several works, including The Best Loved Songs of the Season – Volume 1 and 2 (Japan Times) and Japanese Children’s Songs (Random House/Kodansha). His English versions of dōyō songs have been featured on various Japanese television and radio shows.

In recognition of his cultural contributions, Irwin received the Children’s Music Culture Award from the Japan Children’s Music Association. His work was also included in Japanese junior high school “Morality” textbooks published by Tokyo Shoseki.

Irwin released two albums through Victor Entertainment, titled Blue Eyes and Shoshoji. He also performed in stage productions such as “Nodojiman” at the Nagoya Misonoza Theater and “Oedo de Gozaru” at Shimbashi Embujō Theater.

After winning the FM Yokohama DJ Contest Mayor’s Prize, he was awarded his own radio program, “Amusement Hotline.” This opportunity led to a career in voice-over work.

Irwin is widely recognized as the voice of “You’ve Got Mail” in Japan and served as the in-flight announcer for All Nippon Airways (ANA). His voice is also currently heard on Starlux Airlines. He has voiced commercials for brands such as Kentucky Fried Chicken, Panasonic, Iris Ohyama, Kao, and Nissan. Internationally, he is known as the announcer in the Street Fighter video game series and for various roles in Detective Conan and other games. His narration work includes videos for the Government of Japan, Sony, Hitachi, and NTT Docomo.

=== Event Hosting ===
Irwin has hosted numerous events, including one featuring Roger Clinton, half-brother of U.S. President Bill Clinton. At this event, Irwin met socialite and television personality Dewi Sukarno, who later invited him to host her events.

He has served as MC for a wide range of international and celebrity events in Tokyo, including the Star Wars Convention with Mark Hamill, the Edinburgh Awards with Prince Edward, and the Asian Golden Star Awards. Irwin has also hosted events in India and Mongolia.

=== Wedding MC ===
In addition to his entertainment and broadcasting work, Irwin is known as a bilingual MC for wedding receptions in Japan. Over the course of his career, he has hosted more than 1,000 wedding receptions.

== Filmography ==
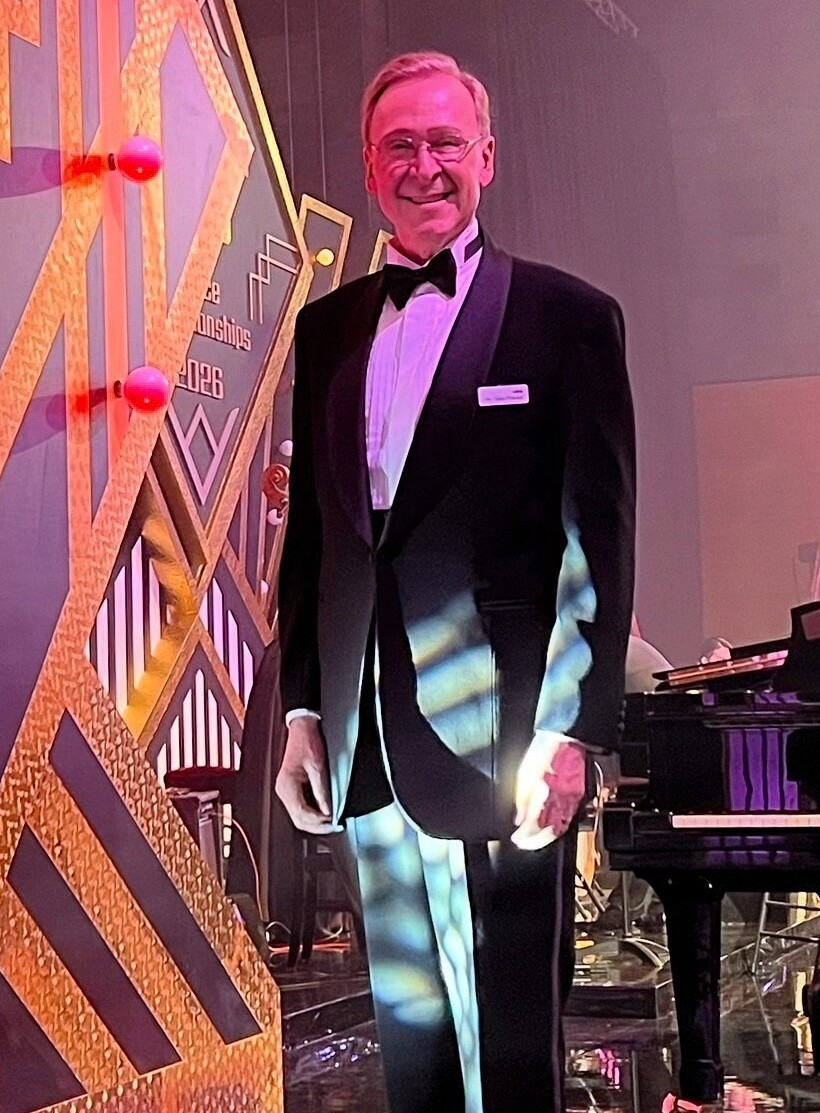
American MC Greg Irwin on stage at Granship in Shizuoka, Japan

=== Television ===
- The Reason I Live in Japan
- Karaoke Battle
- International TV School YU CAN DO IT!
- The Pride of NHK
- Ongaku no Kaze (Wind of Music) Music TV Programme
- Let's Meet on Park Street
- Comedian in Edo
- Sanka Getsukan Eikaiwa (THREE Months English conversation) English TV Programme
- Japanese Countryside Culture Hometown Flight
- SMAP x SMAP
- A Concert Without a Title
- Takeshi's Everyone is a Picasso
- Nama Hama Taikoku Night TV Kanagawa

=== Film ===
- 10Dance (2025, Master of Ceremonies)

== Voice Acting Work ==
=== Television Animation ===
- Flash Night Raid (2010, Victor Bulwer-Lytton)
- Detective Conan (2019, Newscaster)

=== Theatrical Animation ===
- Here is Katsushika-ku Kameari Park Front Office THE MOVIE (1999, Caster)
- Detective Conan: Dimensional Sniper (2014, Fujinami Hiroaki)

=== Game ===
- Street Fighter Alpha 3 (1998, System Voice)
- Shenmue (2000, Others)
- Chaos Break (2000)
- Shenmue II (2002, Additional Voices)
- Bloody Roar Extreme (2002, Japanese System Voice)
- Bloody Roar 4 (2003, Kohryu)
- Michigan: Report from Hell (2005, Jean-Phillipe Brisco)
- The King of Fighters XII (2009)
- Mario Sports Mix (2011)
- Once Upon a Katamari (2025, Japanese and English Narrator)
- Inazuma Eleven: Victory Road (2025, Maxter Lunde)

=== Radio ===
- Radio Vitamin (2008)

=== Commercials ===
- NTT DoCoMo
- House Foods
- Fuji Film
- Mentos
- Karamucho
- Curry Meishi

=== Toys ===
- Kamen Rider My-Th – DX My-Th Driver (2026, voice)

== Discography ==
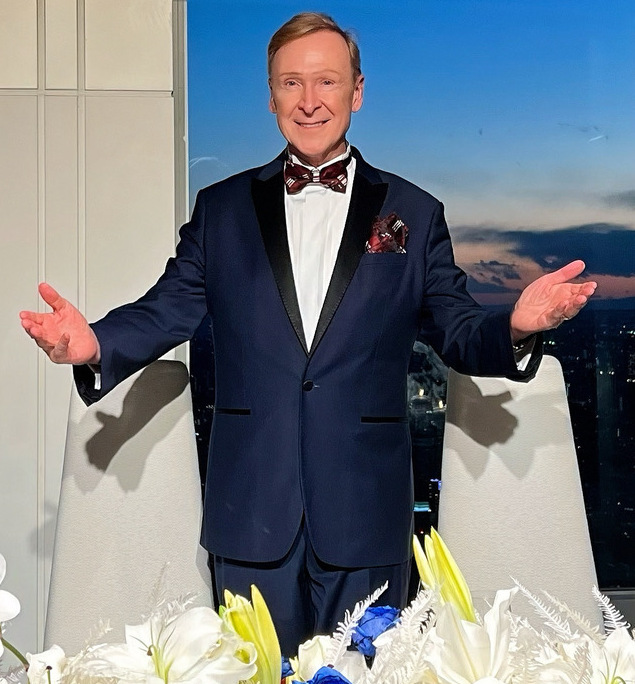
Irwin appearing as the master of ceremonies at a wedding in 2025

=== Singles ===
- Japanese Songs To Sing in English
- Shoshoji
- SING ENGLISH!
- New Hitachi Ondo
- Children's Songs of the World Japan Crown

=== Albums ===
- Happy Child Japan Victor
- Gentle Heart -Songs of Japan-
- Blue Eyes-Beautiful Songs of Japan-Victor Entertainment
- SING ENGLISH!-Master English in 20 Songs-

== Published Works ==
- A Duck Named Alex
- Best Loved Songs of the Season 1 & 2 The Japan Times
- Japanese Children’s Songs, Random House/Kodansha

== Awards ==
- Children’s Music Culture Award, Japan Children’s Music Association
- FM Yokohama DJ Contest Mayor’s Prize
- John Lennon Song Writing Award R&B Category
