= Yoshinao Nakada =

Japanese composer

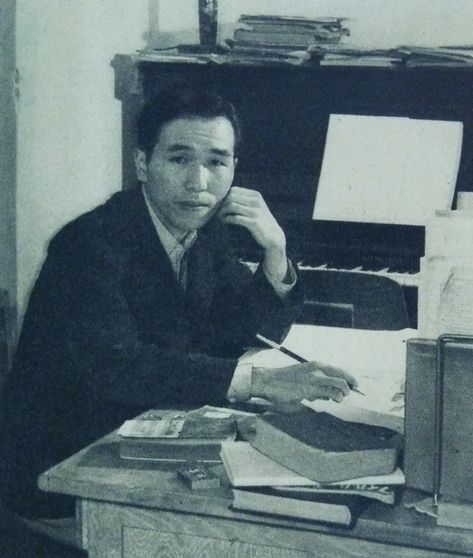
Nakada Yoshinao in 1952

Nakada Yoshinao (中田喜直, Shibuya, Tokyo, 1 August 1923 – 3 May 2000) was a Japanese composer.

== Works, editions and recordings ==
- Japanese Festival - Seventeen Piano Pieces for Students
- Songs - Songs of Japanese Toys; 6 Children's Songs; 8 Children's
- Tanpopo to a poem of Miyoshi Tatsuji
- Etude Allegro
