= Ujō Noguchi =

Japanese poet and lyricist

Noguchi Ujo
- 野口 雨情
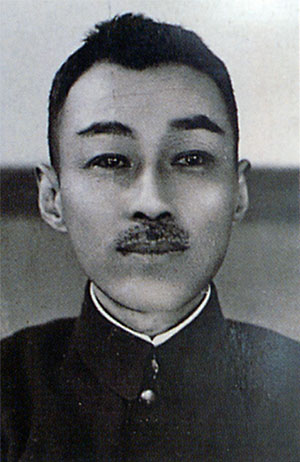
- Born: 野口 英吉 (Eikichi Noguchi); May 29, 1882; Isohara, Ibaraki
- Died: January 27, 1945 (aged 62); Utsunomiya, Tochigi
- Education: Tōkyō Senmon Gakkō
- Occupations: poet, lyricist
- Spouses: Hiro Takashio (高塩 ひろ) (m. 1904; div. 1915) Tsuru Nakazato (中里 つる) (m. 1918)
- Children: 3
- Writing career
- Language: Japanese
- Years active: 1901–1945
- Genres: Shintaishi, children's songs, folksongs, children's literature

Ujō Noguchi (野口 雨情, Noguchi Ujō; May 29, 1882 – January 27, 1945) was a Japanese poet and lyricist of children's songs and traditional Min'yō folk music. He wrote some of the most beloved and familiar pieces for children and youth choirs, such as "Akai Kutsu (Red Shoes)". He, along with Hakushū Kitahara, and Yaso Saijō are considered to be the three great poets and children's songwriters in Japan.

== Early life ==
Ujō Noguchi was born Eikichi Noguchi (野口 英吉) or 栄吉, in the former town of Isohara, Ibaraki, which is now incorporated into the central part of Kitaibaraki city.

He was the eldest son of Ryōhei (量平), a cargo-shipping wholesaler, and Teru (てる). Eikichi was born into a prestigious family that claimed its descent from Kusunoki Masasue, the younger brother of Kusunoki Masashige.)

After completing his 4-year elementary and 4-year senior elementary schooling in his home town, the teenage Eikichi moved to the capital in 1897, where he attended Tōkyō Middle School. It was there he began composing haiku. He continued on to Tōkyō Senmon Gakkō, the precursor of Tōkyō Senmon Gakkō, where he was mentored by novelist Tsubouchi Shōyō. In 1901, he became captivated by the Shintaishi or "New form poetry" movement. He quit college after one year to concentrate on writing poetry.

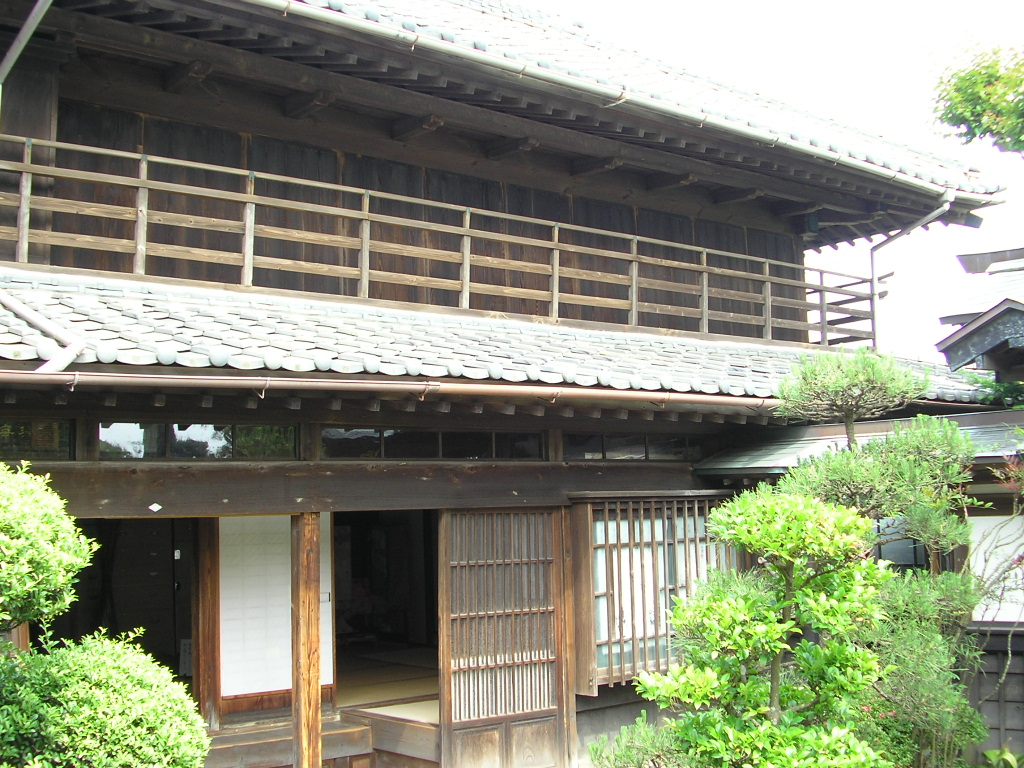
Noguchi's birth home in Isohara, Kitaibaraki

== Head of the household ==
His father's business failure and death in 1904 forced him to return to his hometown as head of the family.

The family had earlier arranged a marriage for Eikichi to the daughter of a wealthy financier from Tochigi Prefecture as a way to salvage the languishing family fortune. Eikichi's married Hiro Takashio (高塩 ひろ) in 1904, when both were 23. The marriage was a reluctant one, and was ultimately doomed.

Eikichi is said to have drowned himself in alcohol, even as he worked on poetry. He formed a salon for poets where they could critique each other's works. It was around this time that Eikichi adopted the pen name of Ujō. He was now able to avail himself of private funds to make his first publication, a collection of min'yō poems, titled Karekusa (枯草) out of Mito, but it failed to bring him either fame or fortune.

Hiro gave birth to their first child, Masao, in March 1906. In June that year, Ujō traveled to Sakhalin on what became a failed business venture. He had traveled to Ōdomari with a geisha, where she then ran off with most of his investment capital. He tried to make a profit by shipping a train-car load of apples to Tōkyō, but to his misfortune, the apples had rotted by the time they arrived.

Hiro came to Tōkyō to urge him to return home, but Noguchi declared that he would stay in Tōkyō and become a poet. In January 1907 he started a monthly periodical of folksongs, Asabana Yobana(?) (『朝花夜花』), without acclaim. He and fellow members Gyofū Sōma and Rofū Miki founded Waseda shisha (Waseda poetic society), and were to meet on a twice monthly basis.

Noguchi soon found himself in Hokkaido, trying to earn a living as a newspaper correspondent. He started at Hokumei Shimbun (北鳴新聞), a small paper in Sapporo, working there from 1906 to 1909. (Note: In Sapporo, Hokkai Times had over 10,000, Hokumon Shimpo 6,000, and Hokumei 800 or 900 circulation. When Noguchi was at a social/political correspondent for Hokumei, Ishikawa became proofreader at Hokumon.) Hiro and their son later came to live there with him.

When the Otaru Nippo (小樽日報) newspaper was formed in the city of Otaru, Noguchi and Takuboku Ishikawa, who was four years his senior, were recruited by the newspaper, becoming colleagues for a brief period. They had first met while still in Sapporo, and in his journal (9/23/1907) Ishikawa described his first impression of Noguchi as being "gentle and polite, black-moustached, and from his very looks he was obviously of a introverted character". Takuboku in Kanashiki omoide adds that Noguchi was "very self-deprecating and would say -goansu instead of -masu," going on to say that the man was less than dashing, and had certain distinct quirks in his pronunciation. They became fast friends. Noguchi tried to organize an ouster of the newspaper's editor-in-chief, and was fired as a result.

Around this time (October, 1907), Noguchi's wife gave birth to a girl, Midori. The child lived for only eight days. It has been said that Noguchi wrote the lyrics to "Shabondama (Soap bubbles)" in 1922, when he wrote of a bubble blown out of a straw that burst and faded before uplifting itself into air; in remembrance of his own child that died without her chance in life.

Noguchi moved to The Hokkai Times (北海タイムス), and worked for three other newspapers before moving to Hokkaido. before he left Hokkaido, he returned briefly to his hometown, eventually returning to Tōkyō. He worked at six papers during this time.

With the death of his mother in 1911, he again returned to his hometown to manage the family-owned timber forests and farms. He had not wholeheartedly abandoned literature, and loathed his livelihood.

== His divorce from Hiro ==
In 1914, Noguchi went to the Iwaki Yumoto Onsen hot springs in Iwaki, Fukushima to treat his hemorrhoids. There, he became intimately involved with a geisha house madam named Kosumi (小すみ) (whose real name was Machi Akimura (明村まち)). He began living at the Kashiwaya geisha house, staying there for three and a half years. In May 1915, he obtained a divorce by consensual agreement from Hiro. Noguchi then took custody of and raised his two children.

In 1918, at the age of 36, Noguchi went to Mito where he married Tsuru Nakazato (中里 つる). It was at this time he resumed composing poetry.

== Literary fame ==
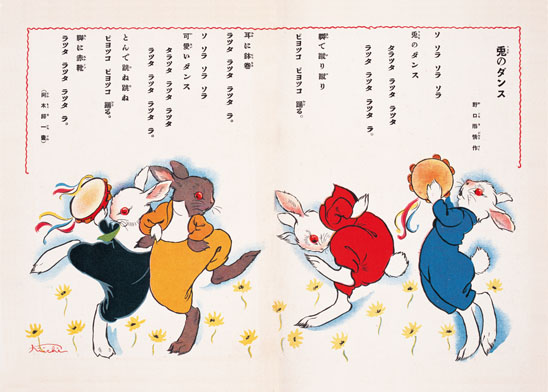
Rabbit Dance, 1924, text by Noguchi, art by Kiichi Okamoto

In 1919, Noguchi published the poetry collection Tokai to Den'en (都会と田園) ("Urbanity and pastoral"), returning to the literary circle. That same year, the magazine Kin no fune (『金の船』, "golden ship") (Later to be called Kin no Hoshi) was founded, and through the referral of Yaso Saijō, Ujō was able to publish a series of children's songs beginning in November. Teaming up with such composers as Shinpei Nakayama, and Nagayo Motoori, and the prolific but obscure Kiyomi Fujii, Noguchi wrote a number of classic songs of lasting fame.

In the recession in the wake of World War I, Noguchi & Nakayama's minyō folksong Sendō kouta (Boatman's song, 1921) struck chord with he audience with its melancholic strains, with its use of the pentatonic minor scale (五音短音階). This song was turned into a film in 1923 (Shōchiku studio), the year the 1923 Great Kantō earthquake struck the Kantō area. Another song lyric that Noguchi wrote that year was set to music by Nakamura in 1928, and became the hit song Habu no uta set in the port of the Izu Ōshima island, it was recorded by Chiyako Sato and by tenor Yoshie Fujiwara.

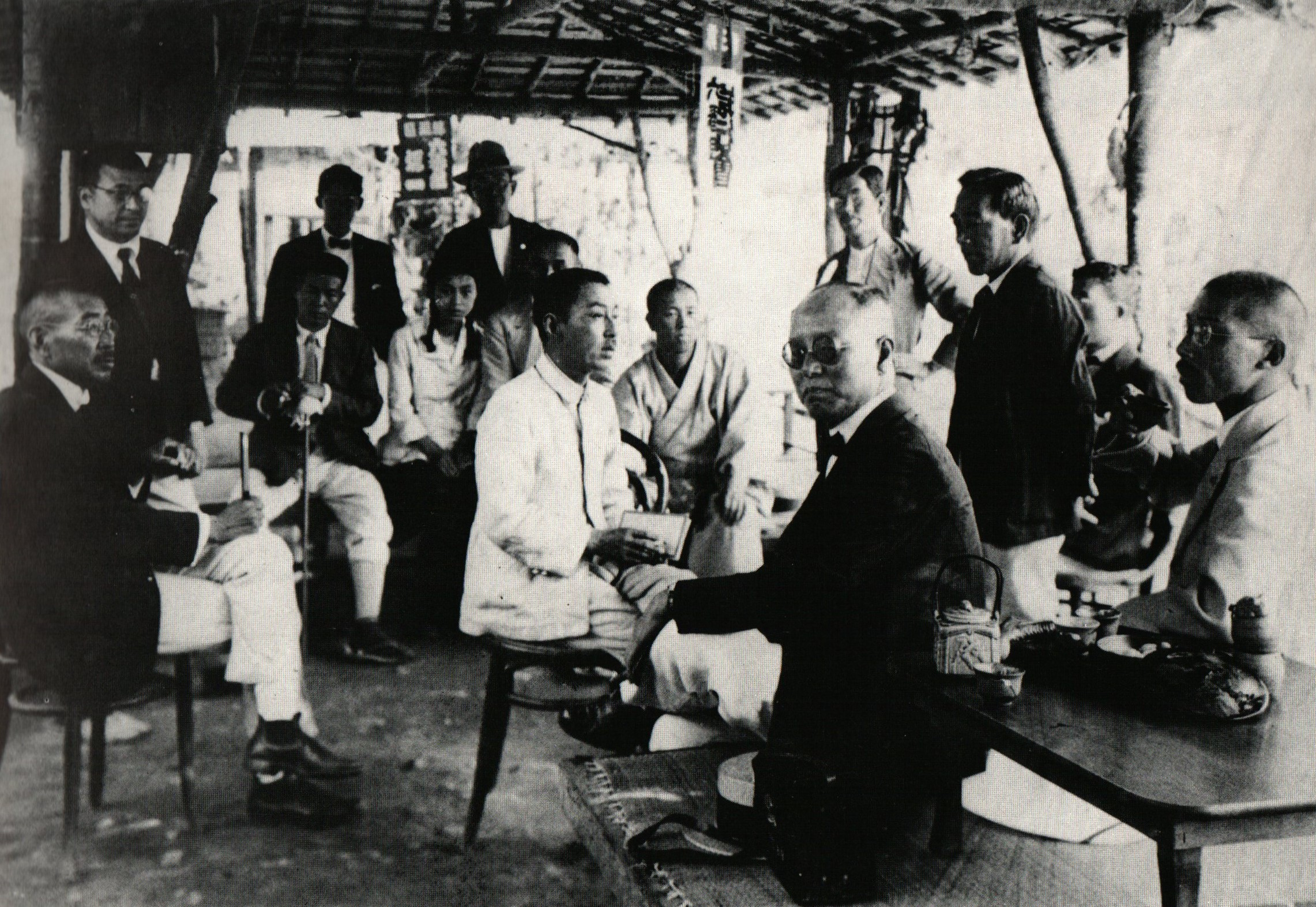
Noguchi visiting Shosenkyo Valley in 1927

Noguchi's children's pieces have a distinct "lonely, melancholic note" (compared with other songwriters of the period), as evident in such works as Jūgoya Otsukisan (十五夜お月さん, "Harvest moon") (the old nanny was given her leave, younger sister was sent away, I wish I could meet mother again), Nanatsu no ko (七ツの子) (why does the crow cry, because it has seven dear children it has left in its old nest in the mountains), Aoi me no ningyō (青い眼の人形 (楽曲), "Blue-eyed doll") (I am a doll from America came to port in Japan, I don't know what I'll do if I lose my way; will the darling girl from Japan play with me?), Amefuri otsuki san (雨降りお月さん, "Rainy moon") (When going off to be married, I will be going all alone holding the karakasa umbrella).

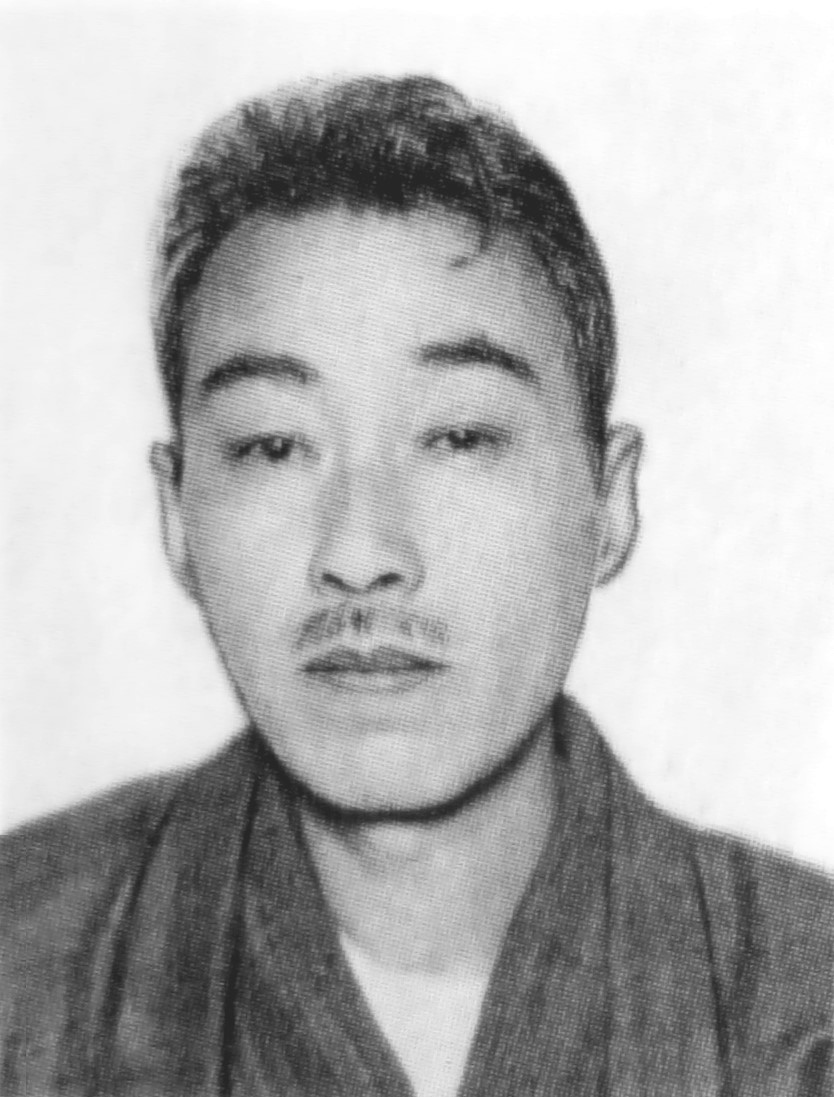
Noguchi before 1945

Noguchi was one of the major exponents of the "first literary movement for improvised children's tales and children's songs (fairy tales and nursery rhymes)" (童話と童謡を創作する最初の文学的運動), to borrow the oft quoted words from the manifesto of Akai tori (although that publication was not where Noguchi published his works). The movement was part of a tide of liberal reforms to children's literature, art, and music, reacting against what musicologist Saburō Sonobe has called the "moralistic and individuality-suppressing, government-brand type of songs and tunes". The movement was not dismissive of the traditional warabe-uta, but respectful of it. For this reason, educators such as Michio Namekawa characterize the movement merely as the "creation of new songs infused with the modernist spirit [and] drawing on existing traditions of Japanese folksong and children's song".

Noguchi resurrected the Nihon Minyō Kyōkai in 1935, becoming its chair (note that this is a different group from the eponymous society active today, which was founded in 1950). He traveled widely throughout Japan, composing pieces that were set locally. In January, the Buddhist music society was founded, and Noguchi was selected as a peer. He also had a hand in creating new Buddhist music, and aiding in its propagation. In 1943 he suffered a mild brain hemorrhage, and died in 1945 in the suburbs of Utsunomiya, Tochigi, where he had been evacuated during the bombing of Tokyo in World War II.

== Memorials ==
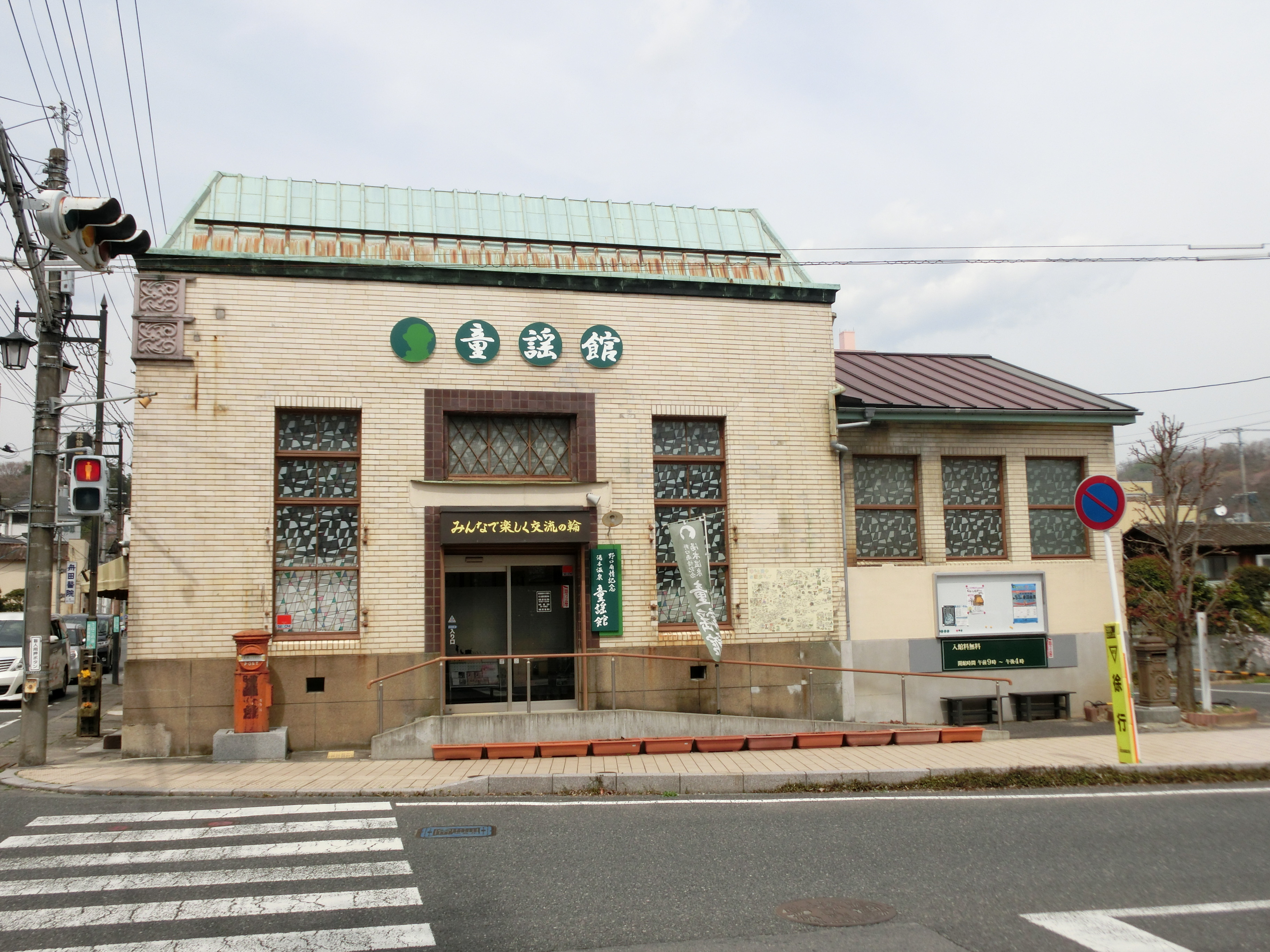
Noguchi Ujo's Memorial Yumoto Hot Springs Children's Song Hall

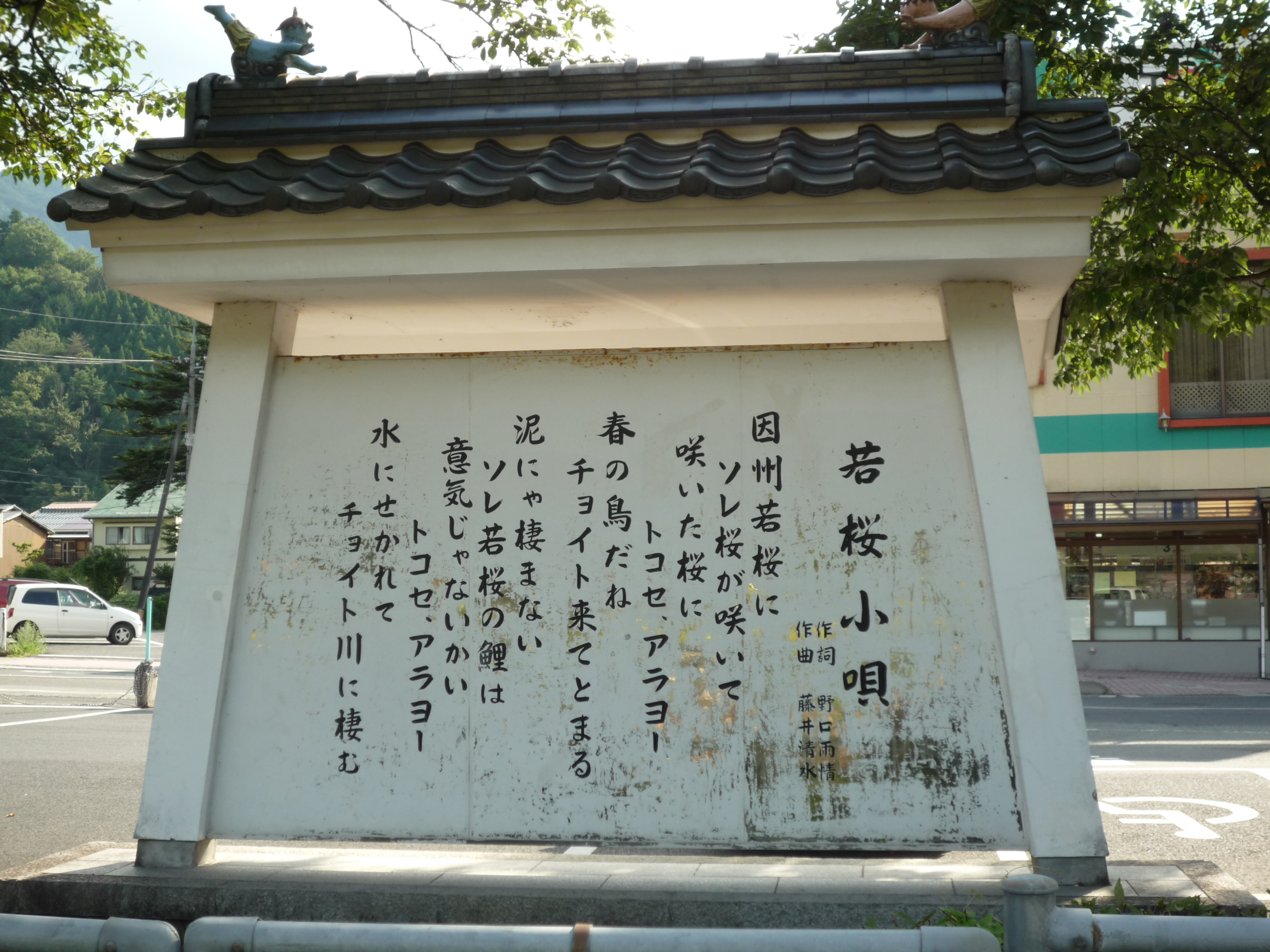
Song monument to Wakasa kouta at Wakasa Station

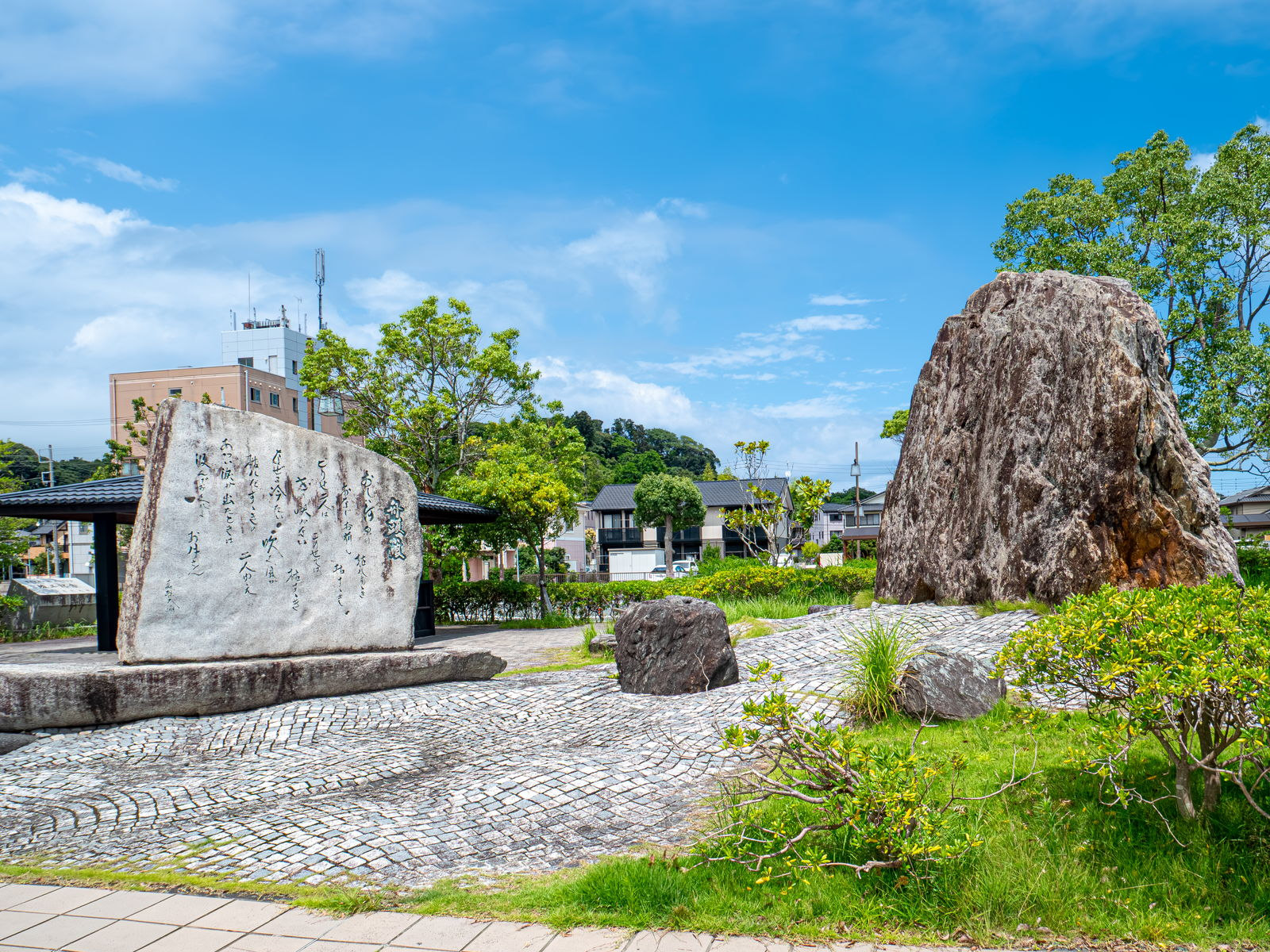
Song monument to Sendō Kouta at Isohara Station

== List of other works ==
- Shojoji no oshosan
- Kogane mushi
- Ano machi kono machi

== See also ==
- Hakushū Kitahara
