= Yaso Saijō =

Japanese poet and lyricist

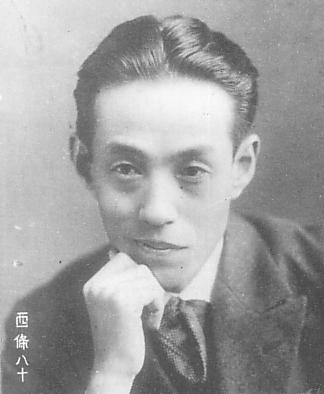
- Born: January 15, 1892; Tokyo
- Died: August 12, 1970 (aged 78); Tokyo
- Education: Waseda University
- Occupations: poet, lyricist, literary scholar
- Writing career
- Years active: 1919–1970
- Notable awards: Order of the Sacred Treasure (3rd class)

Yaso Saijō (Japanese: 西條八十, Hepburn: Saijō Yaso; January 15, 1892 – August 12, 1970) was a Japanese poet, lyricist, and literary scholar. Saijō, Hakushū Kitahara, and Ujō Noguchi are considered to be the three great poets and children's songwriters in Japan.

== Biography ==
Saijō was born in Tokyo. He graduated from the Waseda University Department of English Literature. During his studies, he published works in publications such as "Waseda Bungaku" (早稲田文学) and became a member of the "Mirai" (未来) literary group. He was influenced by Irish literature.

In 1918, Saijō co-founded the children's literary magazine Akai tori (赤い鳥; Red Bird) and published the children's song "Kanaria" (かなりあ). He continued writing children's songs, becoming one of the leading children's poets of the Taishō era. His first poetry collection, titled "Sakin" (砂金), was released in 1919. It was followed by a collection of translated poems, "Hakukujaku" (白孔雀), in 1920.

From 1924 to 1926, Saijō studied at the Sorbonne University. After returning to Japan, he became an assistant professor in the French Department at Waseda University. Eventually, he was appointed a professor.

Aside from children's songs, Saijō also wrote lyrics to popular and military songs. Some of his songs include "Tōkyō Kōshinkyoku" (1929; performed by Chiyako Sato) and "Tōkyō Ondo" (1933). "Tōkyō Kōshinkyoku" has been described by Tōru Mitsui as a "verbal caricature of scenes of modern Tokyo life".

Following the Second World War, Saijō left Waseda University and devoted himself to studying Arthur Rimbaud. He became the first chairman of the Japan Poets Club. He also served as a chairman of the Japanese Society for Rights of Authors, Composers and Publishers. In 1968, he was awarded Order of the Sacred Treasure (3rd class).
