= Akio Yashiro =

Japanese composer (1929–1976)

- Born: September 10, 1929; Tokyo, Japan
- Died: April 9, 1976 (aged 46)
- Other name: 矢代 秋雄
- Occupation: composer
- Relatives: Yukio Yashiro (father)

Akio Yashiro (矢代 秋雄, Yashiro Akio; September 10, 1929 – April 9, 1976) was a Japanese composer.

== Biography ==
He was born in Tokyo. Yashiro entered the Tokyo Music School (presently the Tokyo National University of Fine Arts and Music) in 1945, where he studied composition under Saburo Moroi, Kunihiko Hashimoto, Tomojirō Ikenouchi, and Akira Ifukube, and piano under Noboru Toyomasu, Leonid Kreutzer, and Kiyo Kawakami. Upon finishing graduate courses in 1951, he went to Europe with Toshiro Mayuzumi and Sadao Bekku to study with a French governmental fellowship at Paris Conservatory. There he learned composition and orchestration from Olivier Messiaen, Tony Oban, and Nadia Boulanger. He returned home in 1956.

He received several prizes for his compositions, including the Eighth Mainichi Music Prize in 1957 for String Quartet, which he had written while studying abroad, and Sixteenth Otaka Prize and the Twenty-first National Art Festival Award in 1968 for his Piano Concerto (1964–1967) which was commissioned by NHK.

In 1968, Yashiro was inaugurated as an assistant professor at his alma mater, and he was promoted to professor in 1974. He died suddenly of heart failure at the age of 46.

== List of works ==
- 24 Preludes for piano (1945)
- Sonatina for piano (1945)
- Violin Sonata (1946)
- Nocturne for piano (1947)
- Piano Trio (1948)
- Viola Sonata (1949)
- Suite Classique for piano 4-hands (1951)
- String Quartet (1955)
- Symphony (1958)
- Sonata for two flutes and piano (1958)
- Cello Concerto (1960)
- Piano Sonata (1961)
- Piano Concerto (1967)
- Violin Concerto - unfinished

Flutist Jean-Pierre Rampal and Ensemble Lunaire recorded his transcriptions on Japanese Folk Melodies, CBS Records, (1978).
