= List of Romantic composers =

The Romantic era of Western Classical music spanned the 19th century to the early 20th century, encompassing a variety of musical styles and techniques. Part of the broader Romanticism movement of Europe, Ludwig van Beethoven, Johann Nepomuk Hummel, Gaspare Spontini, Niccolò Paganini, Gioachino Rossini and Franz Schubert are often seen as the dominant transitional figures composers from the preceding Classical era. Many composers began to channel nationalistic themes, such as Mikhail Glinka, The Five and Belyayev circle in Russia; Frédéric Chopin in Poland; Carl Maria von Weber and Heinrich Marschner in Germany; Edvard Grieg in Norway; Jean Sibelius in Finland; Giuseppe Verdi in Italy; Niels Gade and Carl Nielsen in Denmark; Pablo de Sarasate, Isaac Albéniz and Enrique Granados in Spain; Frederick Delius and Edward Elgar in England; Stephen Foster, Edward MacDowell, Horatio Parker and Scott Joplin in the United States; Mykola Lysenko in Ukraine; and Bedřich Smetana and Antonín Dvořák in what is now the Czech Republic.

A European-wide debate took place, particularly in Germany, on what the ideal course of music was, following Beethoven's death. The New German School—primarily Franz Liszt and Richard Wagner—promoted progressive ideas, in opposition to more conservative composers such as Felix Mendelssohn, Robert Schumann and Johannes Brahms.

Note that this list is purely chronological, and includes a substantial number of composers, especially those born after 1860, whose works cannot be conveniently classified as "Romantic", or those whose early compositions did begin in the Romantic style but later developed beyond it in the 20th century.

== Late Classical/Proto-Romantic (born 1770–1799) ==
Name	Date born	Date died	Nationality	Comments
Ludwig van Beethoven	1770	1827	German	Ludwig van Beethoven composer and pianist, regarded by many as the first Romantic-era composer, most famous for Symphony No. 5 and Für Elise among others
Ferdinando Carulli	1770	1841	Italian	Ferdinando Carulli composer for the guitar, wrote concertos and chamber music
Édouard Du Puy	1770	1822	Swiss	Édouard Du Puy composer, singer, director and violinist
Peter Hänsel	1770	1831	German-Austrian	Peter Hänsel composer and violinist
James Hewitt	1770	1827	American	composer, conductor and music publisher
Anton Reicha	1770	1836	Czech-French	Anton Reicha composer who experimented with irregular time signatures in his keyboard fugues, composed a large number of significant works for wind quintet
Christian Heinrich Rinck	1770	1846	German	Christian Heinrich Rinck composer and organist
Jan August Vitásek	1770	1839	Bohemian	composer
Friedrich Witt	1770	1836	German	composer and cellist
Johann Baptist Cramer	1771	1858	English	Johann Baptist Cramer musician of German origin
Ferdinando Paer	1771	1839	Italian	Ferdinando Paer composer
Prince Louis Ferdinand of Prussia	1772	1806	German	Prince Louis Ferdinand of Prussia member of the Prussian royal family, soldier, and composer. At the time of his premature death in the Battle of Saalfeld, he left behind 13 published works, many of which are imbued with a greater expressive depth than the Classical style which was then still prevalent
Maria Frances Parke	1772	1822	English	composer, pianist and soprano
François-Louis Perne	1772	1832	French	composer and musicographer
Josef Triebensee	1772	1846	Bohemian	composer and oboist
Johann Wilhelm Wilms	1772	1847	Dutch-German	Johann Wilhelm Wilms composer, best known for writing Wien Neêrlands Bloed, which served as the Dutch national anthem from 1815 to 1932
Sophie Bawr	1773	1860	French	composer, writer and playwright
Pietro Generali	1773	1832	Italian	composer of operas and vocal music
Wenzel Thomas Matiegka	1773	1830	Czech	composer
Bartolomeo Bortolazzi	1773	1820	Italian	mandolin and guitar virtuoso and composer
Pierre Rode	1774	1830	French	Pierre Rode composer and violinist
Gaspare Spontini	1774	1851	Italian	Gaspare Spontini opera composer and conductor, famous for La vestale
Václav Tomášek	1774	1850	Czech	Václav Tomášek composer and music teacher
Christoph Ernst Friedrich Weyse	1774	1842	Danish	Christoph Ernst Friedrich Weyse composer in the Danish Golden Age
Johann Anton André	1775	1842	German	Johann Anton André composer and music publisher
François-Adrien Boieldieu	1775	1834	French	François-Adrien Boieldieu composer
João Domingos Bomtempo	1775	1842	Portuguese	João Domingos Bomtempo composer, pianist and pedagogue
Bernhard Crusell	1775	1838	Finnish	Bernhard Crusell composer and clarinet player
Sophia Dussek	1775	1831	Scottish	composer of Italian descent, singer, pianist and harpist
François de Fossa	1775	1849	French	composer and guitarist
Ernst Theodor Amadeus Hoffmann	1776	1822	German	composer, author of fantasy and horror, jurist, music critic, draftsman and caricaturist
Joseph Küffner	1776	1856	German	composer and musician
Philipp Jakob Riotte	1776	1856	German	composer
Ignaz von Seyfried	1776	1841	Austrian	composer, musician and conductor
Ludwig Berger	1777	1839	German	composer, pianist and piano teacher
Pauline Duchambge	1778	1858	French	composer and pianist
Johann Nepomuk Hummel	1778	1837	Austrian	Johann Nepomuk Hummel composer and pianist, his music bridged the Classical era of music and Romantic era of music
Sigismund von Neukomm	1778	1858	Austrian	composer and pianist
Fernando Sor	1778	1839	Spanish	Fernando Sor composer for the classical guitar who is credited with elevating the guitar to the level of concert instrument
Rochus Dedler	1779	1822	German	composer
William Knyvett	1779	1856	British	composer and singer
Louise Reichardt	1779	1826	German	composer and songwriter
Luigi Antonio Calegari	1780	1849	Italian	opera composer
Conradin Kreutzer	1780	1849	German	composer and conductor
Louis François Dauprat	1781	1868	French	composer, horn player and music professor at the Conservatoire de Paris
Anton Diabelli	1781	1858	Austrian	Anton Diabelli composer, music publisher and editor
Mauro Giuliani	1781	1828	Italian	Mauro Giuliani composer and virtuoso guitarist
Anthony Heinrich	1781	1861	American	composer
Sophie Lebrun	1781	1863	German	composer and pianist
François-Joseph Naderman	1781	1835	French	François-Joseph Naderman composer, harpist and teacher
Daniel Auber	1782	1871	French	opera composer, noted for La muette de Portici
Carlo Coccia	1782	1873	Italian	opera composer
John Field	1782	1837	Irish	John Field composer and pianist, notable for cultivating the nocturne
Niccolò Paganini	1782	1840	Italian	Niccolò Paganini composer and virtuoso violinist, wrote the 24 Caprices for violin, five concerti for violin, string quartets and works for violin and guitar
Charlotta Seuerling	1782	1828	Swedish	composer, concert singer, harpsichordist and poet
Friedrich Dotzauer	1783	1860	German	composer and cellist
Teresa Belloc-Giorgi	1784	1855	Italian	composer and contralto
Martin-Joseph Mengal	1784	1851	Belgian	composer and instructor
Francesco Morlacchi	1784	1841	Italian	composer
George Onslow	1784	1853	Anglo-French	George Onslow composer
Ferdinand Ries	1784	1838	German	Ferdinand Ries composer, friend and pupil of Ludwig van Beethoven
Louis Spohr	1784	1859	German	Louis Spohr composer, violinist and conductor, renowned for chamber music and compositions for violin and harp
Bettina von Arnim	1785	1859	German	composer, writer and novelist
Marie Bigot	1785	1820	French	composer and piano teacher
Alexandre Pierre François Boëly	1785	1858	French	composer, organist and pianist
Isabella Colbran	1785	1845	Spanish	composer and opera singer
Catherina Cibbini-Kozeluch	1785	1858	Austrian	composer of Bohemian ancestry and pianist
Friedrich Kalkbrenner	1785	1849	German	Friedrich Kalkbrenner composer, pianist and piano teacher
Karol Kurpiński	1785	1857	Polish	composer, conductor and pedagogue
Henry Bishop	1786	1855	English	composer
Friedrich Kuhlau	1786	1832	German-Danish	Friedrich Kuhlau composer
Pietro Raimondi	1786	1853	Italian	composer
Friedrich Schneider	1786	1853	German	Friedrich Schneider composer, pianist, organist and conductor
Carl Maria von Weber	1786	1826	German	Carl Maria von Weber composer, conductor, pianist, guitarist and critic, one of the first significant Romantic opera composers
Alexander Alyabyev	1787	1851	Russian	composer, conductor and pianist
Franz Xaver Gruber	1787	1863	Austrian	school teacher, church organist and composer, best known for his Christmas carol, Silent Night
Michele Carafa	1787	1872	Italian	opera composer
Johann Peter Pixis	1788	1874	German	composer and pianist
Simon Sechter	1788	1867	Austrian	prolific composer, renowned music theorist, teacher, organist and conductor
Elena Asachi	1789	1877	Romanian	composer of Austrian birth, pianist and singer
Nicolas-Charles Bochsa	1789	1856	French	composer and musician
Friedrich Ernst Fesca	1789	1826	German	Friedrich Ernst Fesca composer of instrumental music and violinist
Maria Szymanowska	1789	1831	Polish	composer and virtuoso pianist
Harriet Browne	1790	1858	English	composer and writer
Isaac Nathan	1790	1864	English	composer, musicologist, journalist and self-publicist known as "the father of Australian music"
Carl Czerny	1791	1857	Austrian	Carl Czerny composer, teacher and pianist
Ferdinand Hérold	1791	1833	French	Ferdinand Hérold operatic composer
Giacomo Meyerbeer	1791	1864	German	Giacomo Meyerbeer composer for grand opera (Il crociato in Egitto, Les Huguenots, L'Africaine)
Franz Xaver Wolfgang Mozart	1791	1844	Austrian	Franz Xaver Wolfgang Mozart composer, pianist, conductor, teacher and the youngest child of Wolfgang Amadeus Mozart
Carlo Evasio Soliva	1791	1853	Swiss-Italian	composer
Jan Václav Voříšek	1791	1825	Czech	composer, pianist and organist
Francis Johnson	1792	1844	American	composer, bugler and violinist
Gioachino Rossini	1792	1868	Italian	Gioachino Rossini prolific opera composer, best known for The Barber of Seville among other operas
Hedda Wrangel	1792	1833	Swedish	composer
Cipriani Potter	1792	1871	English	composer, teacher and pianist
Gertrude van den Bergh	1793	1840	Dutch	composer and pianist
Bernhard Klein	1793	1832	German	composer
Caroline Ridderstolpe	1793	1878	Swedish	composer and singer
Princess Amalie of Saxony	1794	1870	German	composer
Ignaz Moscheles	1794	1870	Czech	Ignaz Moscheles composer and piano virtuoso, head of the Leipzig Conservatory after Felix Mendelssohn
Heinrich Marschner	1795	1861	German	Heinrich Marschner composer, considered to be the most important composer of German opera between Carl Maria von Weber and Richard Wagner
Saverio Mercadante	1795	1870	Italian	Saverio Mercadante composer
Nikolaos Mantzaros	1795	1872	Italian-Greek	composer
Helene Liebmann	1795	1835	German	composer and pianist
Franz Berwald	1796	1868	Swedish	composer, little known in his lifetime, but his works, including his four symphonies are better known today
Carl Loewe	1796	1869	German	Carl Loewe composer, baritone singer and conductor
Mathilda d'Orozco	1796	1863	Swedish	composer, noble, salonist, poet, writer, singer, amateur actress and harpsichordist
Giovanni Pacini	1796	1867	Italian	composer
Emilie Zumsteeg	1796	1857	German	composer, pianist, songwriter and choir conductor
Luigi Castellacci	1797	1845	Italian	virtuoso on the mandolin and guitar, instrumental composer and author of popular French romances with guitar and piano accompaniments
Gaetano Donizetti	1797	1848	Italian	Gaetano Donizetti opera composer, known for Lucia di Lammermoor and L'elisir d'amore among others
Franz Schubert	1797	1828	Austrian	Franz Schubert composer, best known for his more than 600 lieder, chamber music, piano works and symphonies
Annette von Droste-Hülshoff	1797	1848	German	composer and writer
Peter IV of Portugal	1798	1834	Portuguese	Peter IV of Portugal king of Portugal and Emperor of Brazil who was also a composer
Antonio Rolla	1798	1837	Italian	composer and violin and viola virtuoso
Olivia Buckley	1799	1847	English	composer, harpist and organist
Marie von Stedingk	1799	1868	Swedish	composer and courtier
Fromental Halévy	1799	1862	French	Fromental Halévy composer
Oscar I of Sweden	1799	1859	Swedish	Oscar I of Sweden composer and king of Sweden and Norway
Alexey Verstovsky	1799	1862	Russian	Alexey Verstovsky composer, musical bureaucrat and rival of Mikhail Glinka

Repertoire key: B=In Classical Net's basic Timeline of Major Composers 1600–present

== Early Romantic (born 1800–1819) ==
Name	Date born	Date died	Nationality	Comments
Jan Kalivoda	1801	1866	Czech	Jan Kalivoda composer, conductor and violinist
Vincenzo Bellini	1801	1835	Italian	Vincenzo Bellini opera composer, known for I Puritani, Norma and La sonnambula among others
Tomasz Padura	1801	1871	Ukrainian-Polish	Tomasz Padura poet of the so-called Ukrainian school, musician-torbanist and composer-songwriter
Charles Auguste de Bériot	1802	1870	Belgian	Charles Auguste de Bériot composer and violinist
Jean-Baptiste Duvernoy	1802	1880	French	composer and pianist
Amédée Méreaux	1802	1874	French	Amédée Méreaux composer, his works are somewhat known for their immense difficulties
Bernhard Molique	1802	1869	German	composer and violinist
Cesare Pugni	1802	1870	Italian	Cesare Pugni prolific composer of ballet music
José Zapiola	1802	1885	Chilean	José Zapiola composer and politic
Eliza Flower	1803	1846	English	composer
Friedrich Theodor Fröhlich	1803	1836	Swiss	Friedrich Theodor Fröhlich composer, composed over 300 pieces for piano
Adolphe Adam	1803	1856	French	Adolphe Adam composer, best known for his ballet score, Giselle
Hector Berlioz	1803	1869	French	Hector Berlioz composer, famous for his programmatic symphony, Symphonie Fantastique
Isidora Zegers	1803	1869	Spanish-Chilean	Isidora Zegers composer and pianist
Henri Herz	1803	1888	Austrian	composer and pianist
Franz Lachner	1803	1890	German	Franz Lachner composer and conductor, brother of Ignaz Lachner and Vinzenz Lachner
Louise Farrenc	1804	1875	French	Louise Farrenc composer of three symphonies and many chamber works including the earliest known sextet for piano and wind quintet (1852)
Mikhail Glinka	1804	1857	Russian	Mikhail Glinka nationalist composer whose works include the opera, A Life for the Tsar
Johann Strauss I	1804	1849	Austrian	Johann Strauss I dance music composer, famous for Radetzky March
Fanny Hensel	1805	1847	German	composer and pianist, sister of Felix Mendelssohn, mainly known for her vocal compositions and chamber music
Leopold von Zenetti	1805	1892	Austrian	composer, mainly known for being one of Anton Bruckner's masters
Friederike Proch Benesch	1805	1872	Czech	pianist, composer, who mostly worked in Vienna
Napoléon Coste	1805	1883	French	virtuoso guitarist, teacher and composer
Manuel Inocêncio Liberato dos Santos	1805	1887	Portuguese	Manuel Inocêncio Liberato dos Santos composer and pianist
Juan Crisóstomo Arriaga	1806	1826	Spanish	composer who died at nineteen and by which time he had already been nicknamed the "Spanish Mozart" for his Symphony in D and three string quartets
Johann Kaspar Mertz	1806	1856	Hungarian	composer, known for his guitar pieces
Johann Friedrich Franz Burgmüller	1806	1874	German	composer and pianist
Carlo Curti	1807	1872	Italian	cellist, performer and educator at Royal School of Music in Parma who composed cello and piano music
Ignaz Lachner	1807	1895	German	Ignaz Lachner conductor, composer and organist, a prolific composer, notable for his chamber music such as his string quartets and trios
Elias Parish Alvars	1808	1849	English	Elias Parish Alvars harpist and composer
Michael William Balfe	1808	1870	Irish	conductor and composer, remembered for his opera, The Bohemian Girl
Sebastián Iradier	1809	1865	Spanish	composer, best known for La Paloma
Felix Mendelssohn	1809	1847	German	Felix Mendelssohn conductor, music-director, composer and pianist, brother of Fanny Mendelssohn, best known for Wedding March from A Midsummer Night's Dream
Otto Lindblad	1809	1864	Swedish	composer
Frédéric Chopin	1810	1849	Polish-French	Frédéric Chopin composer and virtuoso pianist, his works includes nocturnes, ballade, scherzos, etudes and a number of Polish dances such as mazurkas, polonaises and waltzes.
Ferenc Erkel	1810	1893	Hungarian	composer of grand opera
Otto Nicolai	1810	1849	German	opera composer and conductor, best known for The Merry Wives of Windsor
Norbert Burgmüller	1810	1836	German	composer and brother of Friedrich Burgmüller, praised by Robert Schumann
Robert Schumann	1810	1856	German	Robert Schumann composer and pianist, husband of Clara Schumann, a significant lieder writer, a prolific composer, wrote many short piano pieces, four symphonies, concerti and chamber music
Ludwig Schuncke	1810	1834	German	composer and pianist
Ferdinand David	1810	1873	German	composer and violinist
Carl Baermann	1810	1885	German	Carl Baermann composer and clarinetist
Vinzenz Lachner	1811	1893	German	composer, brother of Franz Lachner and Ignaz Lachner
Franz Liszt	1811	1886	Hungarian	Franz Liszt composer and virtuoso pianist, one of the most influential and distinguished piano composers of the Romantic era and the rival of Robert Schumann and Clara Schumann, wrote a number of symphonic poems and extended piano technique, best known for his Hungarian Rhapsodies and other solo piano works
Ferdinand Hiller	1811	1885	German	composer, conductor, writer and music-director, close friend of Felix Mendelssohn. Robert Schumann dedicated his Piano Concerto to him in 1845.
Wilhelm Taubert	1811	1891	German	pianist, composer and conductor whose early works received praise from Felix Mendelssohn
Ambroise Thomas	1811	1896	French	Ambroise Thomas composer, best known for his two operas, Mignon and Hamlet
Spyridon Xyndas	1812	1896	Greek	opera composer and guitarist
Sigismond Thalberg	1812	1871	Austrian	composer and one of the most distinguished pianists of the Romantic era
Louis-Antoine Jullien	1812	1860	French	conductor and composer of light music, king of promenade concerts in England
Emilie Mayer	1812	1883	German	Emilie Mayer composer of eight symphonies as well as overtures, lieder and numerous chamber works
Friedrich von Flotow	1812	1883	German	Friedrich von Flotow composer, chiefly remembered for his opera, Martha
Alexandre Dubuque	1812	1898	Russian-French	composer, known for teaching
Johann Rufinatscha	1812	1893	Austrian	composer
Alexander Dargomyzhsky	1813	1869	Russian	Alexander Dargomyzhsky composer
Semen Hulak-Artemovsky	1813	1873	Ukrainian	Semen Hulak-Artemovsky opera composer, singer (baritone), actor and dramatist
George Alexander Macfarren	1813	1887	English	George Alexander Macfarren major opera composer, best known for Robin Hood, She Stoops to Conquer and Helvellyn, also known as a teacher
Stephen Heller	1813	1888	Hungarian	composer, highly affected the late Romantic composers
Richard Wagner	1813	1883	German	Richard Wagner major opera composer, friend of Franz Liszt, best known for his cycle of four operas, Der Ring des Nibelungen
Ernst Haberbier	1813	1869	German	composer
Giuseppe Verdi	1813	1901	Italian	Giuseppe Verdi major opera composer, best known for Nabucco, Rigoletto, La Traviata, Aida, Otello and Don Carlos
Charles-Valentin Alkan	1813	1888	French	composer and virtuoso pianist
Antonios Liveralis	1814	1842	Greek	opera composer and conductor
Giuseppe Lillo	1814	1863	Italian	composer, best known for his operas among which is worth noting Odda di Bernaver and Caterina Howard
Adolf von Henselt	1814	1889	German	composer and pianist
Josephine Lang	1815	1880	German	composer and pianist
Ferdinand Praeger	1815	1891	German	composer and pianist
Robert Volkmann	1815	1883	German	Robert Volkmann composer, companion of Johannes Brahms
Józef Władysław Krogulski	1815	1842	Polish	composer and pianist
William Sterndale Bennett	1816	1875	English	composer, conductor and editor
Charles Dancla	1817	1907	French	violinist, composer and teacher
Émile Prudent	1817	1863	French	pianist and composer
Károly Thern	1817	1886	Hungarian	composer, conductor and teacher
Niels Gade	1817	1890	Danish	composer, violinist and organist
Henry Litolff	1818	1891	British	pianist, composer and music publisher, best known for his five Concerto Symphoniques
Charles Gounod	1818	1893	French	Charles Gounod composer, best known for his two operas, Faust and Roméo et Juliette
Antonio Bazzini	1818	1897	Italian	violinist, composer and teacher, best known for The Dance of the Goblins
Alexander Dreyschock	1818	1869	Czech	pianist and composer
Jacques Offenbach	1819	1880	French	Jacques Offenbach opera and operetta composer, known for The Tales of Hoffmann and Orpheus in the Underworld
Franz von Suppé	1819	1895	Austrian	Franz von Suppé composer and conductor, notable for his operetta, Light Cavalry
Stanisław Moniuszko	1819	1872	Polish	composer, best known as the father of Polish National Opera
Clara Schumann	1819	1896	German	composer and pianist, wife of Robert Schumann, one of the leading pianists of the Romantic era
Vatroslav Lisinski	1819	1854	Croatian	composer, famous for his first Croatian opera, Love and Malice and his second Croatian opera, Porin

== Middle Romantic (born 1820–1839) ==
Name	Date born	Date died	Nationality	Comments
Henri Vieuxtemps	1820	1881	Belgian	Henri Vieuxtemps composer and violinist
Francisco de Sá Noronha	1820	1881	Portuguese	Francisco de Sá Noronha composer and violinist
Giovanni Bottesini	1821	1889	Italian	conductor, composer and double bass virtuoso
Josip Runjanin	1821	1878	Croatian	composer
Emilie Holmberg	1821	1854	Swedish	composer, concert pianist and organist
Joachim Raff	1822	1882	Swiss-born German	Joachim Raff composer, best known for eleven symphonies, most of them program music
César Franck	1822	1890	Belgian-born French	César Franck composer, noted for his Symphony in D minor, also a significant composer for the organ
James Lord Pierpont	1822	1893	American	composer, best known for Jingle Bells
Luigi Arditi	1822	1903	Italian	composer, violinist and conductor
Édouard Lalo	1823	1892	French	Édouard Lalo composer, remembered for his Symphonie espagnole for violin and orchestra and his Cello Concerto
Theodor Kirchner	1823	1903	German	composer and pianist, he wrote over 1,000 piano pieces
Kurmangazy Sagyrbaev	1823	1896	Kazakhstani	composer
Anton Bruckner	1824	1896	Austrian	Anton Bruckner composer of nine large-scale symphonies (one incomplete) and two more unacknowledged
Frederick Ellard	1824	1874	Australian	composer
Bedřich Smetana	1824	1884	Czech	Bedřich Smetana nationalist composer, best known for his cycle of six symphonic poems, Má vlast and his opera, The Bartered Bride
Carl Reinecke	1824	1910	German	Carl Reinecke composer, conductor and pianist, best known for his attachment to classical forms and conducted Gewandhausorchester for nearly 35 years
Jean-Baptiste Arban	1825	1889	French	composer and virtuoso cornetist, wrote the "Grande méthode complète pour cornet à pistons et de saxhorn" now referred to as the "Trumpeter's Bible"
Johann Strauss II	1825	1899	Austrian	Johann Strauss II composer known as "The Waltz King", son of Austrian dance music composer Johann Strauss I and elder brother of Josef Strauss and Eduard Strauss, best known for Blue Danube Waltz and his opera, Die Fledermaus
Richard Hol	1825	1904	Dutch	organ composer
Stephen Foster	1826	1864	American	composer and songwriter known as "the father of American music", best known for "Oh! Susanna", "Camptown Races", "Old Folks at Home", "My Old Kentucky Home", "Jeanie with the Light Brown Hair", "Old Black Joe" and "Beautiful Dreamer"
Ivar Hallström	1826	1901	Swedish	opera composer
Ludwig Minkus	1826	1917	Austrian	composer of ballet music
Prince Gustaf, Duke of Uppland	1827	1852	Swedish	composer and the second son of Oscar I of Sweden
Josef Strauss	1827	1870	Austrian	composer and younger brother of Johann Strauss II
Adolphe Blanc	1828	1885	French	composer of chamber music
Adrien Barthe	1828	1898	French	composer
Eduard Rohde	1828	1883	German	composer and organist
Johann Dubez	1828	1891	Austrian	composer and mandolinist
Jacques Blumenthal	1829	1908	German	composer
Patrick Gilmore	1829	1892	Irish-born American	composer and bandleader, best known for his song, When Johnny Comes Marching Home
Louis Moreau Gottschalk	1829	1869	American	composer, famous for performing his own romantic piano works
Anton Rubinstein	1829	1894	Russian	Anton Rubinstein conductor, composer and pianist
Pavlos Carrer	1829	1896	Greek	composer, famous for composing the first Greek operas
Karl Goldmark	1830	1915	Hungarian	Karl Goldmark composer
Hans von Bülow	1830	1894	German	Hans von Bülow conductor, composer and virtuoso pianist
Theodor Leschetizky	1830	1915	Polish	pianist, professor and composer
Ivan Larionov	1830	1889	Russian	composer, writer and folklorist
Kornelije Stanković	1831	1865	Serbian	composer
Jan Gerard Palm	1831	1906	Curaçaoan	composer, best known for his mazurkas, waltzes, danzas, tumbas, fantasies and serenades
Célestin Lavigueur	1831	1885	Canadian	opera composer
Hiromori Hayashi	1831	1896	Japanese	Hiromori Hayashi composer, known for the Japanese national anthem, Kimigayo
Joseph Joachim	1831	1907	Hungarian	composer, violinist, conductor and teacher
Eduardo Mezzacapo	1832	1898	Italian	mandolin virtuoso, composer and teacher, known for Aubade for Mandolin, Violin and Guitar and Tarantella "Napoli"
August Söderman	1832	1876	Swedish	composer, best known for his lieder and choral works
Ivan Zajc	1832	1914	Croatian	composer, conductor, director and teacher, best known for his opera, Nikola Šubić Zrinski and his Croatian patriotic song, U boj, u boj
Francis Edward Bache	1833	1858	English	composer and organist
Alexander Borodin	1833	1887	Russian	chemist and nationalist composer, part of the Russian Five, wrote the opera, Prince Igor
Johannes Brahms	1833	1897	German	Johannes Brahms composer, one of the leading musicians of the Romantic period, best known for his four symphonies, Violin Concerto, two piano concertos, and A German Requiem
Amilcare Ponchielli	1834	1886	Italian	Amilcare Ponchielli opera composer, known for La Gioconda
Tekla Bądarzewska-Baranowska	1834	1861	Polish	composer
Julius Reubke	1834	1858	German	Julius Reubke piano and organ composer, known for Sonata on the 94th Psalm
Peter Benoit	1834	1901	Belgian	composer
Giuseppe Branzoli	1835	1909	Italian	mandolinist, violinist, composer and music historian
Felix Draeseke	1835	1913	German	composer
Camille Saint-Saëns	1835	1921	French	Camille Saint-Saëns music critic, composer, pianist and an exceptional organist, best known for his biblical opera, Samson et Dalila
Henryk Wieniawski	1835	1880	Polish	Henryk Wieniawski composer and violinist, famous for two concertos and character pieces of exceptional difficulty
Eduard Strauss	1835	1916	Austrian	composer and younger brother of Johann Strauss II and Josef Strauss
César Cui	1835	1918	Russian	César Cui army officer, music critic and composer of the Russian Five
Davorin Jenko	1835	1914	Slovenian-born Serbian	composer and conductor
Friedrich Baumfelder	1836	1916	German	piano, choral, and orchestra composer, in his day known for his 'Tirocinium musicae' and today known for his 'Melody in F major'
Léo Delibes	1836	1891	French	composer, one of the first significant ballet composers since the Baroque music, known for Coppélia, Sylvia, and Lakmé
Abdu al-Hamuli	1836	1901	Egyptian	Abdu al-Hamuli composer and singer
Antônio Carlos Gomes	1836	1896	Brazilian	opera composer, praised by Franz Liszt and Giuseppe Verdi whose Il Guarany premiered at La Scala in 1870, a first opera ballo for the composer from the New World
Jesús de Monasterio	1836	1903	Spanish	Jesús de Monasterio composer, violinist, conductor and teacher
Bertha Tammelin	1836	1915	Swedish	composer, concert pianist and opera singer
Julius Weissenborn	1837	1888	German	bassoonist, composer and music teacher, famous for his Practical Bassoon School
Tigran Chukhajian	1837	1898	Turkish-Armenian	composer, conductor, public activist and the founder of the first opera institution in the Ottoman Empire
Émile Waldteufel	1837	1915	French	Émile Waldteufel composer of light music
Mily Balakirev	1837	1910	Russian	Mily Balakirev nationalist composer and the leader of the Russian Five
Gordon Saunders	1837	1912	English	composer of songs, church music and organ music, professor at the Trinity College of Music
Georges Bizet	1838	1875	French	Georges Bizet composer, best known for his final opera, Carmen
José Augusto Ferreira Veiga	1838	1903	Portuguese	José Augusto Ferreira Veiga composer
Max Bruch	1838	1920	German	Max Bruch composer, known for his Violin Concerto No. 1, Scottish Fantasy and Kol Nidrei for cello and orchestra
Liliʻuokalani	1838	1917	Hawaiian	composer, known for her popular song, Aloha ʻOe
Henri Ghys	1839	1908	French	pianist, conductor and composer
Modest Mussorgsky	1839	1881	Russian	Modest Mussorgsky nationalist composer and the member of the Russian Five, best known for his orchestral tone poem, Night on Bald Mountain and his piano suite, Pictures at an Exhibition
Eduard Nápravník	1839	1916	Czech	Eduard Nápravník conductor and composer
John Knowles Paine	1839	1906	American	first native-born American composer to acquire international fame for his large-scale orchestral music
Josef Rheinberger	1839	1901	German	composer and organist, born in Liechtenstein, primarily noted for his organ music including 20 sonatas

== Late Romantic (born 1840–1859) ==
Name	Date born	Date died	Nationality	Comments
Pyotr Ilyich Tchaikovsky	1840	1893	Russian	Pyotr Ilyich Tchaikovsky composer, best known for his three ballets, The Nutcracker, Swan Lake and The Sleeping Beauty, the opera Eugene Onegin, Romeo and Juliet Overture-Fantasy, 1812 Overture, Piano Concerto No. 1, Violin Concerto and his six symphonies
John Stainer	1840	1901	English	composer and organist
Louis-Albert Bourgault-Ducoudray	1840	1910	French	composer
Johan Svendsen	1840	1911	Norwegian	composer, conductor and violinist
Louis Brassin	1840	1884	Belgian	pianist, composer and music educator, best known for his piano transcription of the Magic Fire Music from Wagner's Die Walküre
Emmanuel Chabrier	1841	1894	French	Emmanuel Chabrier composer who influenced Maurice Ravel, Les Six, Jean Françaix and many other French composers, known for the opera, L'étoile and the rhapsody, España
Felip Pedrell	1841	1922	Spanish	composer of opera, zarzuela and church music who taught and influenced Isaac Albéniz, Enrique Granados and Manuel de Falla
Giovanni Sgambati	1841	1914	Italian	composer, conductor and pianist
Antonín Dvořák	1841	1904	Czech	Antonín Dvořák composer, best known for his New World Symphony
Giuseppe Silvestri	1841	1921	Italian	composer and mandolin virtuoso
Arrigo Boito	1842	1918	Italian	Arrigo Boito composer and librettist, known as a composer for his opera, Mefistofele
Josef Labor	1842	1924	Austrian	Josef Labor composer, pianist, organist and teacher
Mykola Lysenko	1842	1912	Ukrainian	Mykola Lysenko composer, pianist, conductor and ethnomusicologist
Johann Nepomuk Fuchs	1842	1899	Austrian	composer, conductor, teacher and editor
Jules Massenet	1842	1912	French	Jules Massenet composer, best known for his two operas, Manon and Werther and the Méditation for violin from the opera, Thaïs
Arthur Sullivan	1842	1900	English	Arthur Sullivan composer, known for his operettas in collaboration with William Schwenck Gilbert
Calixa Lavallée	1842	1891	Canadian	composer, known for the Canadian national anthem, O Canada
Émile Bernard	1843	1902	French	composer and organist, known for his Divertissement For Doubled Wind Quintet
Edvard Grieg	1843	1907	Norwegian	Edvard Grieg composer, best known for his 1875 incidental music, Peer Gynt and his Piano Concerto in A minor
David Popper	1843	1913	Czech	composer and virtuoso cellist, known for his 40 etudes, 4 concertos and Hungarian Rhapsody for cello and orchestra
Paul Taffanel	1844	1908	French	Paul Taffanel flautist, conductor and instructor, regarded as the founder of the French Flute School
Nikolai Rimsky-Korsakov	1844	1908	Russian	Nikolai Rimsky-Korsakov composer and the member of the Russian Five, best known for Flight of the Bumblebee from The Tale of Tsar Saltan and his symphonic poem Scheherazade
Pietro Armanini	1844	1895	Italian	Pietro Armanini composer, virtuoso mandolinist and teacher, known for his performances and two dances, La cigale polka pour (The Grasshopper Polka) and L'éventail polka-mazurka (The Range Mazurka)
Pablo de Sarasate	1844	1908	Spanish	Pablo de Sarasate virtuoso violinist and composer, best known for Zigeunerweisen, Carmen Fantasy and his showpieces for the violin
Charles-Marie Widor	1844	1937	French	Charles-Marie Widor composer, known for his works for the organ
Friedrich Nietzsche	1844	1900	German	Friedrich Nietzsche philologist, philosopher, cultural critic, poet and composer
Ion Ivanovici	1845	1902	Romanian	Ion Ivanovici composer, known for his waltz, Waves of the Danube
Gabriel Fauré	1845	1924	French	Gabriel Fauré composer, known for his chamber music and his Requiem among other pieces
Oscar Hammerstein I	1846	1919	German-born American	Oscar Hammerstein I opera composer, businessman and impresario
Albert Mando	1846	1912	American	composer, conductor and music educator
Ignaz Brüll	1846	1907	Austrian	Ignaz Brüll composer and pianist, famous for his opera, Das goldene Kreuz
Luigi Denza	1846	1922	Italian	Luigi Denza opera composer, composed and played for mandolin and guitar
Ferdinando de Cristofaro	1846	1890	Italian	mandolin virtuoso, pianist, composer and music teacher
Zygmunt Noskowski	1846	1909	Polish	Zygmunt Noskowski composer, conductor and teacher
Robert Fuchs	1847	1927	Austrian	Robert Fuchs composer and music teacher
Chiquinha Gonzaga	1847	1935	Brazilian	Chiquinha Gonzaga composer, pianist, and conductor
Augusta Holmès	1847	1903	French	Augusta Holmes composer of Irish descent
Philipp Scharwenka	1847	1917	German-Polish	Philipp Scharwenka composer and music teacher, brother of Xaver Scharwenka
Henri Duparc	1848	1933	French	Henri Duparc composer, noted for seventeen melodies
Hubert Parry	1848	1918	English	Hubert Parry composer, wrote choral song, Jerusalem
Benjamin Godard	1849	1895	French	composer and violinist
Ernesto Köhler	1849	1907	Italian	flautist and composer, known by flautists for his instructional work, Progress in Flute Playing
Calogero Adolfo Bracco	1850	1903	Italian	mandolinist, violinist, composer and conductor, known for I mandolini a congresso
Zdeněk Fibich	1850	1900	Czech	Zdeněk Fibich composer, best known for his two operas, Šárka and The Bride of Messina
Xaver Scharwenka	1850	1924	German-Polish	composer, pianist and music teacher, brother of Philipp Scharwenka
Alexandre Luigini	1850	1906	French	composer and conductor
Alfredo Keil	1850	1907	Portuguese	Alfredo Keil composer, painter, poet, archaeologist and art collector, known for composing the national anthem of Portugal
Tomás Bretón	1850	1923	Spanish	Tomás Bretón composer and conductor
Max Josef Beer	1851	1908	Austrian	composer
Ruperto Chapí	1851	1909	Spanish	Ruperto Chapí composer and co-founder of the Spanish Society of Authors and Publishers
Josif Marinković	1851	1931	Serbian	composer
Vincent d'Indy	1851	1931	French	Vincent d'Indy composer, teacher of Erik Satie and Darius Milhaud among others
Francisco Tárrega	1852	1909	Spanish	composer and virtuoso classical guitarist, known as 'the Father of modern classical guitar playing'
Hans Huber	1852	1921	Swiss	composer
Charles Villiers Stanford	1852	1924	Irish	Charles Villiers Stanford composer
Ciprian Porumbescu	1853	1883	Romanian	composer
Teresa Carreño	1853	1917	Venezuelan	composer and pianist
Arthur Foote	1853	1937	American	Arthur Foote composer and the member of the Second New England School
Engelbert Humperdinck	1854	1921	German	opera composer, influenced by Richard Wagner, famous for Hänsel und Gretel
Leoš Janáček	1854	1928	Czech	composer, known for his operas Káťa Kabanová and Jenůfa and his orchestral pieces Sinfonietta and Taras Bulba
Alfredo Catalani	1854	1893	Italian	Alfredo Catalani composer, known for his two operas, Loreley and La Wally
Moritz Moszkowski	1854	1925	German	composer and pianist who wrote prolifically for the piano, also composed a piano concerto and a violin concerto
John Philip Sousa	1854	1932	American	John Philip Sousa composer and conductor known as "The March King", best known for The Stars and Stripes Forever among other marches
Bernard Zweers	1854	1924	Dutch	Bernard Zweers composer
George Whitefield Chadwick	1854	1931	American	composer
Ernest Chausson	1855	1899	French	Ernest Chausson composer, influenced by César Franck and Richard Wagner, seen as a bridge from them to Claude Debussy
Jean Pietrapertosa	1855	1940	Italian-French	composer and mandolin virtuoso
Julius Röntgen	1855	1932	German-Dutch	composer, influenced by Johannes Brahms, close friend to Edvard Grieg
Anatoly Lyadov	1855	1914	Russian	Anatoly Lyadov composer, teacher and conductor
Arnold Mendelssohn	1855	1933	German	composer and music teacher
Stevan Mokranjac	1856	1914	Serbian	composer
Jacob J. Sawyer	1856	1885	American	composer
Giuseppe Martucci	1856	1909	Italian	composer and music teacher
Frank White Meacham	1856	1909	American	composer and arranger of Tin Pan Alley, best known for his popular march, American Patrol
Sergei Taneyev	1856	1915	Russian	Sergei Taneyev composer, pianist and music teacher
José Tragó	1856	1934	Spanish	José Tragó composer and pianist
Christian Sinding	1856	1941	Norwegian	Christian Sinding composer
Edward Elgar	1857	1934	English	Edward Elgar composer, wrote oratorios, chamber music, concertos and symphonies, best known for his Enigma Variations, Salut d'Amour, Cello Concerto and his Pomp and Circumstance Marches
Cécile Chaminade	1857	1944	French	composer and pianist
Ruggero Leoncavallo	1857	1919	Italian	Ruggero Leoncavallo opera composer, known almost exclusively for Pagliacci
Edwin Eugene Bagley	1857	1922	American	composer, most famous for composing the march, National Emblem
Mathilde Kralik	1857	1944	Austrian	Mathilde Kralik composer, pupil of Anton Bruckner
Giacomo Puccini	1858	1924	Italian	Giacomo Puccini opera composer, known for La bohème, Tosca and Madama Butterfly
Jenő Hubay	1858	1937	Hungarian	violinist, composer and music teacher, also known by his German name Eugen Huber
Eugène Ysaÿe	1858	1931	Belgian	Eugène Ysaÿe composer and virtuoso violinist, known for his solo sonatas for violin
Hans Rott	1858	1884	Austrian	Hans Rott composer and organist, favorite student of Anton Bruckner and praised by Gustav Mahler
Carlo Curti	1859	1922	Italian	Carlo Curti composer, conductor and instrumentalist on xylophone and mandolin, wrote mandolin method. Also, he conducted the first Mexican Typical Orchestra (Orquesta Típica Mexicana)
Mikhail Ippolitov-Ivanov	1859	1935	Russian	Mikhail Ippolitov-Ivanov composer, conductor and teacher
Victor Herbert	1859	1924	Irish-born American	Victor Herbert composer, cellist and conductor, best known for his 1903 operetta, Babes in Toyland
Sergei Lyapunov	1859	1924	Russian	Sergei Lyapunov composer and pianist
Max Fiedler	1859	1939	German	Max Fiedler composer and conductor
Per Lasson	1859	1883	Norwegian	Per Lasson composer, brother of Norwegian painter, Oda Krohg

== Post Romantic (born 1860–1899) ==
Name	Date born	Date died	Nationality	Comments
Isaac Albéniz	1860	1909	Spanish	Isaac Albéniz composer and virtuoso pianist, known for nationalist piano works such as Iberia and a 'set of 12 piano pieces'
Valborg Aulin	1860	1928	Swedish	Valborg Aulin female pianist and composer
Gustave Charpentier	1860	1956	French	Gustave Charpentier composer, best known for his opera, Louise
Gisela Frankl	1860	1935	Austrian	Gisela Frankl pianist and composer
Gustav Mahler	1860	1911	Austrian	Gustav Mahler composer, one of the most important late-Romantic/early-Modernist composers, his works include ten innovative large-scale and sometimes programmatic symphonies and many lieder
Edward MacDowell	1860	1908	American	Edward MacDowell composer, best known for his piano concertos and piano suites, his works include his most popular short piece, "To a Wild Rose"
Hugo Wolf	1860	1903	Austrian	Hugo Wolf composer of lieder, influenced by Richard Wagner
Ignacy Jan Paderewski	1860	1941	Polish	Ignacy Paderewski pianist and composer
Anton Arensky	1861	1906	Russian	Anton Arensky composer, pianist and music teacher
Spyridon Samaras	1861	1917	Greek	Spyridon Samaras opera composer, widely known for his composition of the "Olympic Hymn"
Wilhelm Berger	1861	1911	German	Wilhelm Berger composer, pianist and conductor
Georgy Catoire	1861	1926	Russian	composer
Václav Suk	1861	1933	Czech-born Russian	Václav Suk composer, violinist and conductor
Stéphan Elmas	1862	1937	Armenian	Stéphan Elmas composer, pianist and teacher
Claude Debussy	1862	1918	French	Claude Debussy composer, one of the most prominent figures working within the field of Impressionist music, best known for Clair de Lune from Suite bergamasque
Frederick Delius	1862	1934	English	Frederick Delius composer, used chromaticism in many of his compositions
Edward German	1862	1936	English	Edward German composer of Welsh descent, known for his three comic operas, Merrie England, A Princess of Kensington and Tom Jones
Alberto Williams	1862	1952	Argentine	Alberto Williams composer and conductor
Emil von Sauer	1862	1942	German	Emil von Sauer composer, pianist, editor and teacher
Hugo Becker	1863	1941	German	Hugo Becker composer and cellist
Pietro Mascagni	1863	1945	Italian	Pietro Mascagni opera composer, known for Cavalleria Rusticana
Horatio Parker	1863	1919	American	Horatio Parker composer, organist and teacher
Gabriel Pierné	1863	1937	French	Gabriel Pierné composer, conductor and organist
Ricardo Castro	1864	1907	Mexican	Ricardo Castro composer, works include piano music
Alexander Gretchaninov	1864	1956	Russian	Alexander Gretchaninov composer
Sakunosuke Koyama	1864	1927	Japanese	Sakunosuke Koyama composer and music teacher
Alberto Nepomuceno	1864	1920	Brazilian	Alberto Nepomuceno composer
Clarence L. Partee	1864	1915	American	Clarence L. Partee composer for banjo, mandolin and guitar
Guy Ropartz	1864	1955	French	Guy Ropartz composer and conductor
Richard Strauss	1864	1949	German	Richard Strauss composer, known for Also Sprach Zarathustra (based on the book, Thus Spoke Zarathustra by Friedrich Nietzsche), wrote many symphonic poems, operas and lieder
Paul Dukas	1865	1935	French	Paul Dukas composer, known for his piece of program music, The Sorcerer's Apprentice
Eduardo di Capua	1865	1917	Italian	Eduardo di Capua composer, known for his song, "'O sole mio"
Herbert J. Ellis	1865	1903	English	Herbert Ellis musician (banjo, mandolin and guitar), wrote method books, more than 1000 compositions
Paul Gilson	1865	1942	Belgian	Paul Gilson musician and composer
Alexander Glazunov	1865	1936	Russian	Alexander Glazunov composer, influenced by Richard Wagner and Franz Liszt
Albéric Magnard	1865	1914	French	Albéric Magnard composer
Carl Nielsen	1865	1931	Danish	Carl Nielsen composer, renowned for his six symphonies and concerti
Jean Sibelius	1865	1957	Finnish	Jean Sibelius composer of eight symphonies and the Violin Concerto in D minor, known also for Finlandia and symphonic poems including En saga, Lemminkäinen (which includes the Swan of Tuonela), The Oceanides, and Tapiola
Vasily Kalinnikov	1866	1901	Russian	Vasily Kalinnikov composer of two symphonies
Tor Aulin	1866	1914	Swedish	Tor Aulin violinist, conductor and composer
Ferruccio Busoni	1866	1924	Italian	Ferruccio Busoni composer and pianist, known for his opera, Turandot and his many transcriptions and arrangements of Johann Sebastian Bach
Francesco Cilea	1866	1950	Italian	Francesco Cilea composer, particularly known for his two operas, L'arlesiana and Adriana Lecouvreur
Amanda Aldridge	1866	1956	British	Amanda Aldridge composer, opera singer and teacher
Vladimir Rebikov	1866	1920	Russian	Vladimir Rebikov composer and pianist
Erik Satie	1866	1925	French	Erik Satie composer and pianist, best known for Les Trois Gymnopédies
Georg Schumann	1866	1952	German	Georg Schumann composer, older brother of Camillo Schumann; no relation to Robert Schumann
Johann Strauss III	1866	1939	Austrian	Johann Strauss III composer, son of Eduard Strauss
Learmont Drysdale	1866	1909	Scottish	composer
Samuel Maykapar	1867	1938	Russian	Samuel Maykapar composer
Amy Beach	1867	1944	American	Amy Beach composer and pianist
Umberto Giordano	1867	1948	Italian	Umberto Giordano opera composer
Enrique Granados	1867	1916	Spanish	Enrique Granados composer and pianist, known for his piano works and chamber music
Wilhelm Peterson-Berger	1867	1942	Swedish	Wilhelm Peterson-Berger composer, wrote symphonies, operas, vocal and piano music
Charles Koechlin	1867	1950	French	Charles Koechlin composer, teacher and writer on music
Scott Joplin	1868	1917	American	Scott Joplin composer and pianist known as "The Ragtime King", best known for Maple Leaf Rag and The Entertainer among other ragtime compositions
Oskar Merikanto	1868	1924	Finnish	Oskar Merikanto musician and composer
Granville Bantock	1868	1946	British	composer
Hermann Bischoff	1868	1936	German	composer
Hamish MacCunn	1868	1916	Scottish	composer, conductor and teacher, most famous for The Land of the Mountain and the Flood
Vittorio Monti	1868	1922	Italian	composer, violinist and conductor, most famous for Csárdás
José Vianna da Motta	1868	1948	Portuguese	pianist, teacher and composer, most famous for Symphony 'À Pátria', Op. 13
Juventino Rosas	1868	1894	Mexican	Juventino Rosas composer, known for his song, "Sobre las Olas"
Jan Brandts Buys	1868	1933	Dutch-Austrian	composer
Tokichi Setoguchi	1868	1941	Japanese	Tokichi Setoguchi composer, music educator, conductor and clarinetist, famous for Warship March
Seth Weeks	1868	1953	American	Seth Weeks composer, music educator, jazz bandleader and mandolinist
Siegfried Wagner	1869	1930	German	opera composer, conductor and the son of Richard Wagner
Demetrios Lialios	1869	1940	Greek	composer of chamber music
Julius Conus	1869	1942	Russian	composer and violinist
Albert Roussel	1869	1937	French	Albert Roussel composer
Armas Järnefelt	1869	1958	Finnish	composer and conductor
Harry Lawrence Freeman	1869	1954	American	opera composer, conductor, impresario and teacher, best known for his African-American opera, Voodoo
Alfred Hill	1869	1960	Australian-New Zealand	composer, conductor and teacher
John Nicholas Klohr	1869	1956	American	composer of band music, most famous for The Billboard March
Leopold Godowsky	1870	1938	Polish	composer, pianist and teacher
Zygmunt Stojowski	1870	1946	Polish	composer and pianist
Oscar Straus	1870	1954	Austrian	Oscar Straus composer, no relation to the musical Strauss family of Vienna (Johann Strauss I, Johann Strauss II, Josef Strauss, Eduard Strauss and Johann Strauss III)
Franz Lehár	1870	1948	Hungarian	composer, mainly known for his operettas
Florent Schmitt	1870	1958	French	composer
Luigi von Kunits	1870	1931	Serbian-born Austrian	composer and conductor, founder of the Pittsburg and Toronto symphony orchestras
Guillaume Lekeu	1870	1894	Belgian	composer, known for his violin sonata
Louis Vierne	1870	1937	French	Louis Vierne composer and organist, titular organist of Notre-Dame de Paris
Nobu Kōda	1870	1946	Japanese	Nobu Kōda composer, violinist and music teacher
Frederick Converse	1871	1940	American	composer
Alfredo D'Ambrosio	1871	1914	Italian	violinist and composer
Giacomo Balla	1871	1958	Italian	futurist composer and artist
Zacharia Paliashvili	1871	1933	Georgian	Zacharia Paliashvili composer, known for the eclectic fusion of Georgian folk songs and stories with 19th century Romantic classical themes. He was the founder of the Georgian Philharmonic Society and later, the head of the Tbilisi State Conservatoire
Henry Kimball Hadley	1871	1937	American	composer and conductor, known for the opera, Cleopatra's Night
Oreste Ravanello	1871	1938	Italian	composer, known for works for choir and for organ
Wilhelm Stenhammar	1871	1927	Swedish	Wilhelm Stenhammar composer, conductor and pianist
Alexander von Zemlinsky	1871	1942	Austrian	Alexander von Zemlinsky composer and music teacher, his students include Arnold Schoenberg and Erich Wolfgang Korngold
Stanislav Binički	1872	1942	Serbian	composer
Hugo Alfvén	1872	1960	Swedish	Hugo Alfvén composer, known for Swedish Rhapsody, works include choral music and five symphonies
Julius Fučík	1872	1916	Czech	Julius Fučík composer and conductor of military bands, known for Entrance of the Gladiators
Rubin Goldmark	1872	1936	American	composer, pianist, educator and nephew of Karl Goldmark
Alexander Scriabin	1872	1915	Russian	Alexander Scriabin composer and pianist, known for his harmonically adventurous piano sonatas and theatrically orchestral works, characteristic period compositions include his Op. 1 to Op. 30 works
Ralph Vaughan Williams	1872	1958	English	Ralph Vaughan Williams composer, his works include nine symphonies, Fantasia on a Theme by Thomas Tallis and other orchestral poems
Salvator Léonardi	1872	1938	Italian	composer, performer and teacher, known for Souvenir de Catania, Souvenir de Napoli, Souvenir de Sicile and Angeli e Demoni
Camillo Schumann	1872	1946	German	composer, younger brother of Georg Schumann; no relation to Robert Schumann
William Henry Bell	1873	1946	English	composer, conductor and lecturer
Leo Fall	1873	1925	Austrian	composer of operettas
Pascual Marquina Narro	1873	1948	Spanish	prolific orchestral and operatic composer
Sergei Rachmaninoff	1873	1943	Russian	Sergei Rachmaninoff composer, conductor and virtuoso pianist, wrote three symphonies, four piano concertos, Rhapsody on a Theme of Paganini and solo piano music
Max Reger	1873	1916	German	prolific composer, known for his Variations and Fugue on a Theme by Mozart
Reynaldo Hahn	1874	1947	Venezuelan	composer, known for his strikingly beautiful and unabashedly tonal melodies
Gustav Holst	1874	1934	English	Gustav Holst composer, best known for his orchestral suite, The Planets
Charles Ives	1874	1954	American	composer, member of the American Five, best known for The Unanswered Question and his Concord Sonata
Arnold Schoenberg	1874	1951	Austrian-American	Arnold Schoenberg composer, whose early works (e.g. Verklärte Nacht) are influenced by Richard Wagner, but subsequently developed atonalism and serialism with such watershed works as Moses und Aron
Josef Suk	1874	1935	Czech	Josef Suk composer and violinist
Franz Schmidt	1874	1939	Austrian	composer, influenced by Anton Bruckner and Johannes Brahms
Eugénie-Victorine-Jeanne Alombert	1874	1964	French	composer and pianist
Reinhold Glière	1875	1956	Russian	Reinhold Glière composer
Julián Carrillo	1875	1965	Mexican	composer, conductor, violinist and music theorist
Fritz Kreisler	1875	1962	Austrian	composer and virtuoso violinist, known for his sweet sound, composed short showpieces for the violin
Richard Wetz	1875	1935	German	composer, influenced by Anton Bruckner
Maurice Ravel	1875	1937	French	Maurice Ravel composer, best known for Boléro
Franco Alfano	1875	1954	Italian	composer and pianist
Albert Ketèlbey	1875	1959	English	composer, conductor and pianist
Samuel Coleridge-Taylor	1875	1912	English	composer, known for his trilogy of cantatas, The Song of Hiawatha
Alexander Koshetz	1875	1944	Ukrainian	Alexander Koshetz choral conductor, arranger, composer, ethnographer, writer, musicologist and lecturer
Mikalojus Konstantinas Čiurlionis	1875	1911	Lithuanian	painter and composer
Henriette Renié	1875	1956	French	harpist and composer
Josef Hofmann	1876	1957	Polish-American	Josef Hofmann composer and pianist
Edgar Bara	1876	1962	French	mandolinist and composer, conducted mandolin orchestra
John Alden Carpenter	1876	1951	American	composer
Manuel de Falla	1876	1946	Spanish	Manuel de Falla composer, best known for The Three-Cornered Hat
Flor Alpaerts	1876	1954	Belgian	composer, notable students include the two composers, Denise Tolkowsky and Ernest Schuyten
Mieczysław Karłowicz	1876	1909	Polish	Mieczysław Karłowicz composer, his style is of late-Romantic and nationalist character
Filippo Tommaso Marinetti	1876	1944	Italian	Filippo Marinetti futurist composer, poet, and editor
Fermo Dante Marchetti	1876	1940	Italian	Fermo Marchetti composer, best known for the song, "Fascination"
Ludolf Nielsen	1876	1939	Danish	Ludolf Nielsen composer, violinist, conductor and pianist
Carl Ruggles	1876	1971	American	composer, painter and the member of the American Five, whose representative Romantic-period work is the lieder Ich fühle deinen Odem
Ermanno Wolf-Ferrari	1876	1948	Italian	Ermanno Wolf-Ferrari composer and music teacher, known for his comic operas
Nakao Tozan	1876	1956	Japanese	Nakao Tozan performer and prolific composer, known for his works of the Tozan school
Petar Krstić	1877	1957	Serbian	composer and conductor
Antonio Russolo	1877	1942	Italian	futurist composer and brother of Luigi Russolo
Ernst von Dohnányi	1877	1960	Hungarian	Ernst von Dohnányi conductor, composer and pianist
Elisabeth Kuyper	1877	1953	Dutch	Elisabeth Kuyper composer and conductor
Paul Ladmirault	1877	1944	French	Paul Ladmirault composer
Mykola Leontovych	1877	1921	Ukrainian	Mykola Leontovych composer, choral conductor and teacher, known for his arrangement of the carol "Shchedryk", known in English as "Carol of the Bells" or as "Ring Christmas Bells"
Sergei Bortkiewicz	1877	1952	Russian	Sergei Bortkiewicz composer and pianist
Isidor Bajić	1878	1915	Serbian	Isidor Bajić composer, conductor, teacher and publisher
Gabriel Dupont	1878	1914	French	Gabriel Dupont composer, known for his operas and chamber music
Joseph Holbrooke	1878	1958	English	Joseph Holbrooke composer, conductor and pianist
Franz Schreker	1878	1934	Austrian	Franz Schreker conductor, composer and music teacher, primarily a composer of operas
Teiichi Okano	1878	1941	Japanese	Teiichi Okano composer
Conrado del Campo	1878	1953	Spanish	Conrado del Campo composer, violinist and pedagogue
Frank Bridge	1879	1941	English	Frank Bridge composer, best known as the teacher of Benjamin Britten, characteristic period compositions include Suite for String Orchestra and his Capriccio Nos. 1 and 2
Viggo Brodersen	1879	1965	Danish	Viggo Brodersen composer and pianist
Adolf Wiklund	1879	1950	Swedish	Adolf Wiklund composer, conductor and pianist
Joseph Canteloube	1879	1957	French	Joseph Canteloube composer, primarily known for Chants d'Auvergne
Hamilton Harty	1879	1941	Irish	Hamilton Harty composer and conductor, best known for An Irish Symphony
John Ireland	1879	1962	English	composer, whose Piano Concerto is representative
Carmela Mackenna	1879	1962	Chilean	Carmela Mackenna composer and pianist
Alma Mahler	1879	1964	Austrian	Alma Mahler composer and wife of Gustav Mahler
Otto Olsson	1879	1964	Swedish	composer
Ottorino Respighi	1879	1936	Italian	composer, known for his three symphonic poems, Fountains of Rome, Pines of Rome, and Roman Festivals
Rudolf Sieczyński	1879	1952	Austrian	Rudolf Sieczyński composer
Cyril Scott	1879	1970	English	composer, writer and poet
Rentarō Taki	1879	1903	Japanese	Rentarō Taki composer and pianist
Nikolai Medtner	1880	1951	Russian	Nikolai Medtner composer and pianist
Clarence Cameron White	1880	1960	American	neoromantic composer and concert violinist
Emilios Riadis	1880	1935	Greek	composer, famous for his song cycles
Béla Bartók	1881	1945	Hungarian	Béla Bartók composer, pianist and ethnomusicologist
Kenneth J. Alford	1881	1945	English	composer of marches for band, most famous for Colonel Bogey March
Igor Stravinsky	1882	1971	Russian	Igor Stravinsky composer, pianist and conductor, best known for his three ballets, The Firebird, Petrushka and The Rite of Spring and his characteristic Romantic-style compositions include Symphony in E-flat, Scherzo fantastique and Fireworks
Maximilian Steinberg	1883	1946	Russian	Maximilian Steinberg composer, whose musical language was influenced by Glazunov and Rimsky-Korsakov's late Romanticism before developing into socialist realism by the late 1920s, characteristic period compositions include his Symphonies Nos. 1 and 2 and his Fantaisie dramatique
Arnold Bax	1883	1953	English	Arnold Bax composer, poet and author, best known for his orchestral music
Manolis Kalomiris	1883	1962	Greek	Manolis Kalomiris composer and founder of the Greek National School of Music
Klaus Pringsheim Sr.	1883	1972	German-born Japanese	composer, conductor and music educator
Enrique Soro Barriga	1884	1954	Chilean	Enrique Soro Barriga composer and pianist
Edwin York Bowen	1884	1961	English	York Bowen composer and pianist
Charles Tomlinson Griffes	1884	1920	American	Charles Tomlinson composer, known for his musical impressionism
Alfonso Leng	1884	1974	Chilean	Alfonso Leng composer and dentist
Marios Varvoglis	1885	1967	Greek	Marios Varvoglis composer
Dimitrios Levidis	1885	1951	Greek	Dimitrios Levidis composer
Nagayo Motoori	1885	1945	Japanese	Nagayo Motoori composer
Pedro Humberto Allende	1885	1957	Chilean	Pedro Humberto composer and pianist who serves as the first Chilean impressionist composer
Kōsaku Yamada	1886	1965	Japanese	Kōsaku Yamada composer and conductor
Kurt Atterberg	1887	1974	Swedish	Kurt Atterberg composer and conductor
Carlos Isamitt	1887	1974	Chilean	Carlos Isamitt composer, painter and musicologist
Nadia Boulanger	1887	1979	French	Nadia Boulanger composer, pianist and organist
Max Steiner	1888	1971	Austrian-born American	composer and conductor who emigrated to America and became one of Hollywood's greatest musical composers
Philip Greeley Clapp	1888	1954	American	educator, conductor, pianist and composer of classical music
María Rodrigo	1888	1967	Spanish	María Rodrigo composer and pianist
Sverre Jordan	1889	1972	Norwegian	Sverre Jordan composer and conductor
Morishige Takei	1890	1949	Japanese	Morishige Takei composer, guitarist and mandolinist
Luís de Freitas Branco	1890	1955	Portuguese	Luís de Freitas Branco composer and musicologist
Sergei Prokofiev	1891	1953	Russian	Sergei Prokofiev composer, pianist and conductor, best known for his ballet, Romeo and Juliet, his characteristic Romantic works include his Piano Sonata No. 1 in F Minor and his 4 Etudes
Darius Milhaud	1892	1974	French	Darius Milhaud composer, conductor and teacher
Ferde Grofé	1892	1972	American	Ferde Grofé composer, arranger, pianist and instrumentalist, best known for Grand Canyon Suite
Sayed Darwish	1892	1923	Egyptian	Sayed Darwish composer, arranger and singer
Lili Boulanger	1893	1918	French	Lili Boulanger composer and the first female winner of the Prix de Rome prize
Rued Langgaard	1893	1952	Danish	Rued Langgaard composer and organist
Tamezō Narita	1893	1945	Japanese	Tamezō Narita composer
Michio Miyagi	1894	1956	Japanese	Michio Miyagi composer and musician, famous for his koto playing
William Grant Still	1895	1978	American	William Grant Still composer known as "The Dean of Afro-American Composers"
Carl Orff	1895	1982	German	Carl Orff composer and music educator, best known for his cantata, Carmina Burana
Eva Jessye	1895	1992	American	Eva Jessye composer, conductor and singer
Leo Ornstein	c. 1895	2002	Ukrainian-American	Leo Ornstein composer and pianist, though had a reputation as an avant-garde composer during his youth, he has composed characteristic Romantic-period works including Scherzino in B Minor, the piano suite Seeing Russia with Teacher, and 9 Miniatures
Virgil Thomson	1896	1989	American	Virgil Thomson composer and critic
António Fragoso	1897	1918	Portuguese	António Fragoso composer and pianist
Henry Cowell	1897	1965	American	Henry Cowell composer, writer, pianist, publisher, teacher and the husband of Sidney Robertson Cowell
Erich Wolfgang Korngold	1897	1957	Moravian-born American	Erich Wolfgang Korngold composer and conductor
George Gershwin	1898	1937	American	George Gershwin composer and pianist known as "The New York Citizen", best known for Rhapsody in Blue and An American in Paris as well as his opera, Porgy and Bess
Mischa Levitzki	1898	1941	American	Mischa Levitzki composer and pianist of Romantic-style works
Lev Knipper	1898	1974	Soviet and Russian	composer, best known for his Song of the Plains
