= Works associated with Paul Wittgenstein =

This is a list of works associated with Paul Wittgenstein.

These works were either:

- arranged for left hand by him (A)
- commissioned by him (C)
- dedicated to him or written with him in mind (D), or
- premiered by him (P).

Composer	Work	Legend	Comments
Johann Sebastian Bach	Keyboard Partita No. 1 in B♭ major, BWV 825: VII, Gigue; The Well-Tempered Clavier, Book I: Prelude No. 1 in C, BWV 846; Little Prelude No. 3 in C minor, BWV 999; Solo Violin Partita No. 2 in D minor, BWV 1004: V, Chaconne; Flute Sonata in E♭: Sicilienne; Violin Sonata in F minor: III	A	Wittgenstein arranged only the piano part of the Violin Sonata movement
Bach-Gounod	Meditation ("Ave Maria")	A	
Ludwig van Beethoven	Piano Sonata No. 3 in C, Op. 2/3: Adagio (excerpt); Piano Sonata No. 7 in D, Op. 10/3: Largo (excerpt); Piano Sonata No. 23 in F minor Appassionata, Op. 57: Allegro assai (excerpt)	A	
Sergei Bortkiewicz	Piano Concerto No. 2 in C minor, Op. 28	CDP	Premiered 11 January 1929. It draws on material from Bortkiewicz's first attempt at a piano concerto.
Johannes Brahms	Variations on an Original Theme, Op. 21/1: Variation 7; An die Nachtigall, Op. 46/4	A	Wittgenstein arranged only the piano part of the song
Rudolf Braun	Piano Concerto for the left hand	DP	Premiered 31 October 1927.
Rudolf Braun	Three Piano Pieces for the Left Hand: Scherzo, Perpetuum Mobile, Serenata	D	Composed 1922, pub 1928.
Benjamin Britten	Diversions for Piano Left Hand and Orchestra, Op. 21	DP	Originally called Concert Variations; premiered 17 January 1942.
Frédéric Chopin	Étude in C minor, Revolutionary, Op. 10/12 (exists in 2 versions) (paraphrases); Scherzo No. 1 in B minor, Op. 20 (excerpts); Étude in A minor, Op. 25/11 (paraphrase)	A	
Norman Demuth	Piano Concerto (1947); Three Preludes for Paul Wittgenstein (1947); Legend for piano and orchestra (1949)	D	
Hans Gál	Piano Quartet in A major	DP	Premiered 1928.
Leopold Godowsky	Symphonic Metamorphosis of the Schatz-Walzer themes from The Gypsy Baron by Johann Strauss II	D	Written for Wittgenstein, but he never played it so Godowsky rededicated it to Simon Barere.
Edvard Grieg	Lyric Pieces, Book III, Op. 43: No. 1, Butterfly; No. 3, Melancholy; No. 4, Little Bird	A	
Ernst Haberbier	Poetic Study, Op. 53/20 (Tremolo)	A	
Joseph Haydn	Piano Sonata in A♭ major: II; String Quartet, Op. 64/5: Adagio; String Quartet, Op. 76/3: II, variation 1	A	
Adolf von Henselt	Etude, Op. 5/11 Liebeslied (Love Song)	A	
Josef Herz	Intermezzo for the left hand	D	
Paul Hindemith	Klaviermusik (Concerto for Piano and Orchestra), Op. 29 (1924)	CD	Wittgenstein did not understand the work and refused to play it. He kept the score, but never spoke of it, and it was believed lost. It was discovered in his papers after his widow's death in 2002. It had its world premiere in Berlin in 2004, with Leon Fleisher and the Berlin Philharmonic; the U.S. premiere was on 2 October 2005, with Fleisher and the San Francisco Symphony, under Herbert Blomstedt.
Alexis Holländer (1840–1924)	Two tone poems for the left hand alone, Op. 69 (Venetian Gondola Song, and an arrangement of Franz Schubert's Erlkönig, D.328)	D	
Leonard Kastle	Piano Concerto	D	
Erich Wolfgang Korngold	Piano Concerto for the left hand in C♯, Op. 17 (1923)	CDP	Wittgenstein was given lifelong exclusive rights to play the concerto; first performed 22 September 1924, the composer conducting. The UK premiere was in 1985, with Gary Graffman.
Erich Wolfgang Korngold	Suite for 2 Violins, Violoncello and Piano (left hand), Op. 23 (1930)	CDP	First performance in Vienna on 21 October 1930 by Wittgenstein with members of the Rosé Quartet.
Josef Labor	Concert Piece in form of variations in D major (1915)	DP	Written when Wittgenstein was a prisoner of war in Omsk, Siberia, Russia. This was the work with which he made his return to the concert platform in Vienna, as a one-armed pianist.
Josef Labor	Quartet in C minor for piano, violin, viola and cello, Op. 6 (1916)	D	
Josef Labor	Violin Sonata in E major (1916)	DP	Premiered 9 January 1917.
Josef Labor	Concert Piece in F minor (1917)	DP	Premiered 26 October 1936.
Josef Labor	Trio in E minor for piano, clarinet and cello (1917)	D	
Josef Labor	Cello Sonata in C major (1918)	D	
Josef Labor	Trio in G minor piano, clarinet and viola (1919)	DP	Premiered 25 January 1932.
Josef Labor	Fantasy in F♯ minor (1920)	D	
Josef Labor	Concert Piece in E♭ major (1923)	D	
Josef Labor	Septet for flute, clarinet, bassoon, horn, violin, cello and piano	D	Unfinished.
Josef Labor	Quintet (Divertimento) for piano, flute, oboe, viola and cello	DP	Premiered 18 March 1932.
Felix Mendelssohn	Songs Without Words, Book 6, Op. 67: No. 1 in E♭, No. 3 in B♭; Incidental music to A Midsummer Night's Dream, Op. 61: Notturno	A	
Giacomo Meyerbeer	Bathers' Chorus from the opera Les Huguenots	A	
Wolfgang Amadeus Mozart	Serenade No. 11 for winds in E♭, K. 375: Adagio	A	
Sergei Prokofiev	Piano Concerto No. 4, Op. 53 (1931)	CD	He did not understand the work, and would not play it until such time as he did - but that never eventuated. The premiere was on 5 September 1956, played by Siegfried Rapp, a German pianist who had lost his right arm during World War II.
Giacomo Puccini	Chorus from the opera Madama Butterfly	A	
Maurice Ravel	Piano Concerto for the Left Hand in D major (1929–32)	CDP	He gave the premiere on 5 January 1932, with the Vienna Symphony Orchestra under Robert Heger. The dedication was reassigned after Wittgenstein's sole performing rights expired in 1943.
Felix Rosenthal (1867–1936)	Impromptu for the left hand	D	Found in his papers after his death.
Moriz Rosenthal	Neuer Wiener Carneval nach Themen von Johann Strauss (before 1935)	D	
Moriz Rosenthal	Fantasy on Gounod's Faust	D	The score is signed and inscribed: Paul Wittgenstein in Bewunderung zugeeignet von Moritz Rosenthal (Dedicated to Paul Wittgenstein in admiration by Moritz Rosenthal).
Moriz Rosenthal	Un poco serioso (MS)	D	Autograph manuscript of an untitled work. Extensively annotated by Wittgenstein.
Anton Rubinstein	Étude on false notes	A	
Franz Schmidt	Concertante Variations on a Theme of Beethoven for piano (left hand alone) and orchestra (1923)	DP	Premiered Vienna 2 February 1924.
Franz Schmidt	Piano Quintet in G major (1926)	DP	Premiered 1927.
Franz Schmidt	Quintet in B for piano, clarinet, violin, viola and cello (1932)	DP	Premiered 1933.
Franz Schmidt	Piano Concerto No. 2 in E♭ major (1934)	DP	Premiered Vienna 10 February 1935.
Franz Schmidt	Quintet in A for piano, clarinet, violin, viola and cello (1938)	D	Premiered 1939 by Friedrich Wührer. The finale is a set of variations on a theme by Josef Labor, and Wittgenstein often performed this lengthy movement as an independent piece.
Franz Schmidt	Toccata in D minor (1938)	D	
Franz Schubert trans. Franz Liszt	Meeresstille, D.216 (trans. Liszt S.557b, S.558/5); Du bist die Ruh, D.665 (trans. Liszt S.558/3)	A	
Robert Schumann	Album for the Young, Op. 68: No. 1, Melodie; No. 14, Kleine Studie; Bunte Blätter, Op. 99: Nos. 1, 7	A	
Eduard Schütt	Paraphrase on "Tales from the Vienna Woods", piano left-hand and orchestra	P	Premiered February 1925, Musikvereinsaal, Vienna
Eduard Schütt	Paraphrase for piano left hand and orchestra	DP	Premiered 27 June 1929.
Johann Strauss II	Morgenblätter (excerpt)	A	
Richard Strauss	Parergon zur Symphonia Domestica, for piano left hand and orchestra, Op. 73	D	
Richard Strauss	Panathenäenzug, Symphonic Studies in the form of a Passacaglia for piano left hand and orchestra, Op. 74 (1926–27)	DP	It was written with him in mind and he gave the first performance, but it was not formally dedicated to him.
Richard Strauss	Exercises for the left hand (1926)	D	
Alexandre Tansman	Concert Piece for Piano left hand (1943)	D	
Richard Wagner	Quintet from the opera Die Meistersinger von Nürnberg	A	
Wagner trans. Liszt	"Isoldes Liebestod" from the opera Tristan und Isolde, S.447	A	
Ernest Walker	Study for the Left Hand, Op. 47 (1931)	D	
Ernest Walker	Variations on an Original Theme, for piano, clarinet and string trio (no opus no.; 1933)	D	
Ernest Walker	Prelude (Larghetto), Op. 61 (1935)	D	
Karl Weigl	Piano Concerto (1924)	D	
