= Experimental music =

Music genre

Experimental music is a general label for any music or music genre that pushes existing boundaries and genre definitions. Experimental compositional practice is defined broadly by exploratory sensibilities radically opposed to, and questioning of, institutionalized compositional, performing, and aesthetic conventions in music. Elements of experimental music include indeterminacy, in which the composer introduces the elements of chance or unpredictability with regard to either the composition or its performance. Artists may approach a hybrid of disparate styles or incorporate unorthodox and unique elements.

The practice became prominent in the mid-20th century, particularly in Europe and North America. John Cage was one of the earliest composers to use the term and one of experimental music's primary innovators, utilizing indeterminacy techniques and seeking unknown outcomes. In France, as early as 1953, Pierre Schaeffer had begun using the term musique expérimentale to describe compositional activities that incorporated tape music, musique concrète, and elektronische Musik. In America, a quite distinct sense of the term was used in the late 1950s to describe computer-controlled composition associated with composers such as Lejaren Hiller. Harry Partch and Ivor Darreg worked with other tuning scales based on the physical laws for harmonic music. For this music they both developed a group of experimental musical instruments. Musique concrète is a form of electroacoustic music that utilises acousmatic sound as a compositional resource. Free improvisation or free music is improvised music without any rules beyond the taste or inclination of the musician(s) involved; in many cases, the musicians make an active effort to avoid clichés; i.e., overt references to recognizable musical conventions or genres.

== Definitions and usage ==
=== Origins ===
The Groupe de Recherches de Musique Concrète (GRMC), under the leadership of Pierre Schaeffer, organized the First International Decade of Experimental Music between 8 and 18 June 1953. This appears to have been an attempt by Schaeffer to reverse the assimilation of musique concrète into the German elektronische Musik, and instead tried to subsume musique concrète, elektronische Musik, tape music, and world music under the rubric "musique experimentale". Publication of Schaeffer's manifesto was delayed by four years, by which time Schaeffer was favoring the term "recherche musicale" (music research), though he never wholly abandoned "musique expérimentale".

John Cage was also using the term as early as 1955. According to Cage's definition, "an experimental action is one the outcome of which is not foreseen", and he was specifically interested in completed works that performed an unpredictable action. In Germany, the publication of Cage's article was anticipated by several months in a lecture delivered by Wolfgang Edward Rebner at the Darmstädter Ferienkurse on 13 August 1954, titled "Amerikanische Experimentalmusik". Rebner's lecture extended the concept back in time to include Charles Ives, Edgard Varèse, and Henry Cowell, as well as Cage, due to their focus on sound as such rather than compositional method.

=== Alternative classifications ===
Composer and critic Michael Nyman starts from Cage's definition, and develops the term "experimental" also to describe the work of other American composers (Christian Wolff, Earle Brown, Meredith Monk, Malcolm Goldstein, Morton Feldman, Terry Riley, La Monte Young, Philip Glass, Steve Reich, etc.), as well as composers such as Gavin Bryars, John Cale, Toshi Ichiyanagi, Cornelius Cardew, John Tilbury, Frederic Rzewski, and Keith Rowe. Nyman opposes experimental music to the European avant-garde of the time (Boulez, Kagel, Xenakis, Birtwistle, Berio, Stockhausen, and Bussotti), for whom "The identity of a composition is of paramount importance". The word experimental in the former cases "is apt, providing it is understood not as descriptive of an act to be later judged in terms of success or failure, but simply as of an act the outcome of which is unknown".

David Cope also distinguishes between experimental and avant-garde, describing experimental music as that "which represents a refusal to accept the status quo". David Nicholls, too, makes this distinction, saying that "...very generally, avant-garde music can be viewed as occupying an extreme position within the tradition, while experimental music lies outside it".

Warren Burt cautions that, as "a combination of leading-edge techniques and a certain exploratory attitude", experimental music requires a broad and inclusive definition, "a series of ands, if you will", encompassing such areas as "Cageian influences and work with low technology and improvisation and sound poetry and linguistics and new instrument building and multimedia and music theatre and work with high technology and community music, among others, when these activities are done with the aim of finding those musics 'we don't like, yet', [citing Herbert Brün] in a 'problem-seeking environment' [citing Chris Mann]".

Benjamin Piekut argues that this "consensus view of experimentalism" is based on an a priori "grouping", rather than asking the question "How have these composers been collected together in the first place, that they can now be the subject of a description?" That is, "for the most part, experimental music studies describes [sic] a category without really explaining it". He finds laudable exceptions in the work of David Nicholls and, especially, Amy Beal, and concludes from their work that "The fundamental ontological shift that marks experimentalism as an achievement is that from representationalism to performativity", so that "an explanation of experimentalism that already assumes the category it purports to explain is an exercise in metaphysics, not ontology".

Leonard B. Meyer, on the other hand, includes under "experimental music" composers rejected by Nyman, such as Berio, Boulez and Stockhausen, as well as the techniques of "total serialism", holding that "there is no single, or even pre-eminent, experimental music, but rather a plethora of different methods and kinds".

=== Abortive critical term ===
In the 1950s, the term "experimental" was often applied by conservative music critics—along with a number of other words, such as "engineers art", "musical splitting of the atom", "alchemist's kitchen", "atonal", and "serial"—as a deprecating jargon term, which must be regarded as "abortive concepts", since they did not "grasp a subject". This was an attempt to marginalize, and thereby dismiss various kinds of music that did not conform to established conventions. In 1955, Pierre Boulez identified it as a "new definition that makes it possible to restrict to a laboratory, which is tolerated but subject to inspection, all attempts to corrupt musical morals. Once they have set limits to the danger, the good ostriches go to sleep again and wake only to stamp their feet with rage when they are obliged to accept the bitter fact of the periodical ravages caused by experiment." He concludes, "There is no such thing as experimental music ... but there is a very real distinction between sterility and invention".

Starting in the 1960s, "experimental music" began to be used in America for almost the opposite purpose, in an attempt to establish an historical category to help legitimize a loosely identified group of radically innovative, "outsider" composers. Whatever success this might have had in academe, this attempt to construct a genre was as abortive as the meaningless namecalling noted by Metzger, since by the "genre's" own definition the work it includes is "radically different and highly individualistic". It is therefore not a genre, but an open category, "because any attempt to classify a phenomenon as unclassifiable and (often) elusive as experimental music must be partial". Furthermore, the characteristic indeterminacy in performance "guarantees that two versions of the same piece will have virtually no perceptible musical 'facts' in common".

=== Computer composition ===
In the late 1950s, Lejaren Hiller and L. M. Isaacson used the term in connection with computer-controlled composition, in the scientific sense of "experiment": making predictions for new compositions based on established musical technique. The term "experimental music" was used contemporaneously for electronic music, particularly in the early musique concrète work of Schaeffer and Henry in France. There is a considerable overlap between Downtown music and what is more generally called experimental music, especially as that term was defined at length by Nyman in his book Experimental Music: Cage and Beyond (1974, second edition 1999).

== History ==
=== Influential antecedents ===
A number of early 20th-century American composers, seen as precedents to and influences on John Cage, are sometimes referred to as the "American Experimental School". These include Charles Ives, Charles and Ruth Crawford Seeger, Henry Cowell, Carl Ruggles, and John Becker.

=== New York School ===
The New York School was an informal group of American poets, painters, dancers, and musicians active in the 1950s and 1960s in New York City. They often drew inspiration from Marcel Duchamp, Dada, and contemporary avant-garde art movements, in particular conceptual art, pop art, jazz, improvisational theater, experimental music, and the interaction of friends in the New York City art world's vanguard circle. Composers included John Cage, Earle Brown, Christian Wolff, Morton Feldman, and David Tudor, among others. Dance related: Merce Cunningham.

=== Musique concrète ===
Musique concrète (French; literally, 'concrete music') is a form of electroacoustic music that utilises acousmatic sound as a compositional resource. The compositional material is not restricted to the inclusion of sonorities derived from musical instruments or voices, nor to elements traditionally thought of as "musical" (melody, harmony, rhythm, metre, etc.). The theoretical underpinnings of the aesthetic were developed by Pierre Schaeffer, beginning in the late 1940s.

=== Fluxus ===
Fluxus was an artistic movement started in the 1960s, characterized by an increased theatricality and the use of mixed media. Another known musical aspect appearing in the Fluxus movement was the use of Primal Scream at performances, derived from the primal therapy. Yoko Ono used this technique of expression.

=== Transethnicism ===
The term "experimental" has sometimes been applied to the mixture of recognizable music genres, especially those identified with specific ethnic groups, as found for example in the music of Laurie Anderson, Chou Wen-chung, Steve Reich, Kevin Volans, Martin Scherzinger, Michael Blake, and Rüdiger Meyer.

=== Free improvisation ===
Free improvisation or free music is improvised music without any rules beyond the taste or inclination of the musician(s) involved; in many cases the musicians make an active effort to avoid overt references to recognizable musical genres.
