= American Five =

Group of modernist American composers

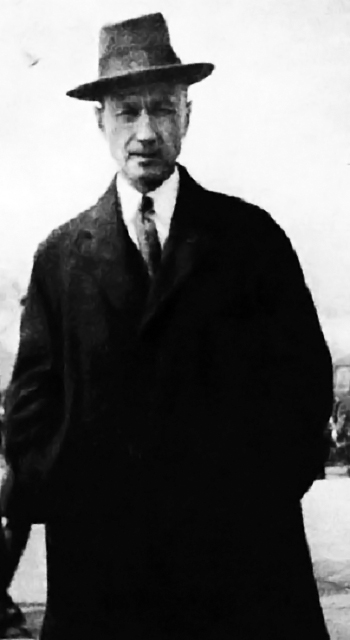
Charles Ives

The American Five is a collective name applied by some writers to the modernist American composers Charles Ives (1874–1954), John J. Becker (1886–1961), Wallingford Riegger (1885–1961), Henry Cowell (1897–1965), and Carl Ruggles (1876–1971). They were noted for their modernist and often dissonant compositions which broke away from European compositional styles to create a distinctly American style. The name was coined in imitation of the group of Russian composers called The Five.

The origin of the term "The American Five" is unclear. The five composers, although many of them were known to each other, did not work, or publicise themselves, as a group. According to Don C. Gillespie, "the first use of the phrase [an 'American Five'] seems to have been made by the composer John Downey in 1962, the year following Becker's death." However, Stuart Feder credits Gillespie, saying that, "Gillespie has called them 'the American Five.'" Gilbert Chase says that Gillespie, "the leading authority on Becker," credits Becker as "'the first person to promulgate the theory of the "Ives group," or "The American Five," as it is often called today.'" Stephen Budiansky credits Becker, saying that he, "began insisting that he was one of the 'American Five' great modern composers." Peter Garland has written that Dennis Russell Davies organized "the 1980 Cabrillo Music Festival around my [i.e. Garland's] thesis-idea of 'The American Five'", and found a supporter in Lou Harrison.

The music historian Richard Taruskin notes that a group of composers including Becker, Riegger and Ruggles, and also Dane Rudhyar and Ruth Crawford Seeger, became associated with Cowell during the period when he published the magazine The New Music Quarterly (1927–1936). The magazine was financed by Ives. Taruskin (who does not use the term 'American Five' in his survey) comments that "the members [of this group] shared both a technical orientation and an expressive purpose which, like Ives's own may be jointly summed up as transcendental maximalism."

== See also ==
- Atonality
- Complementation
- Dissonant counterpoint
- Polyrhythm
- Tone cluster
