= Merton Brown =

American classical composer

Merton Brown (May 5, 1913, Berlin, Vermont – February 20, 2001, Charlestown, Massachusetts) was an American composer who studied with Wallingford Riegger and Carl Ruggles. He often collaborated with choreographers including former Martha Graham dancer Matti Haim, José Limón, and Thomas Hewitt.

Virgil Thomson describes him as a "neo-contrapuntalist" influenced by Carl Ruggles and involved with "rounded [melodic] material", but not so much with the "personalized sentiment" involved in neoromanticism.

== Works ==
- Cantabile for string orchestra
- Concerto Breve for string orchestra
- Concerto Grosso for band
- Consort for Four Voices for string quartet or two pianos
- Movement for string quartet
- String Trio for violin, viola, and cello
- Chorale to Olin Stephens for string quintet or string orchestra
- Three Motets for string quartet
- Trio for flute, violin, and cello
- Arioso for piano
- Sonata in One Movement for piano
- Piano Sonata
- Toccata for piano
- Three Etudes for piano
- Three Songs (Rilke) for voice and string trio
- Two Songs for voice and piano
- Cat Duets (written for David Edgar Walther)
- Poems of James Joyce
