= Josef Labor =

Austrian composer, pianist and organist (1842–1924)

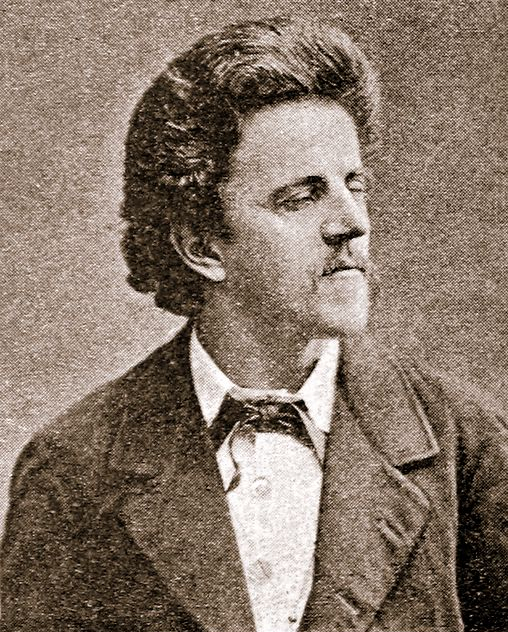
Labor (c. 1875)

Josef Paul Labor (29 June 1842 – 26 April 1924) was an Austrian pianist, organist, and composer of the late Romantic era. Labor was an influential music teacher. As a friend of some key figures in Vienna, his importance was enhanced.

== Biography ==
Labor was born in the town of Hořovice in Bohemia to Josef Labor, an administrator of ironworks, and his wife Josefa Wallner, who came from a family of doctors. Both his parents came from Viennese families. His father belonged to the circle of Schubert-Friends and had been in his younger years a composer himself. At the age of three, he was left blind due to contracting smallpox. He attended the Institute for the Blind in Vienna and the Konservatorium der Gesellschaft der Musikfreunde (Conservatory of the Society of Friends of Music) where he studied composition with Simon Sechter (teacher of Bruckner), and piano with Eduard Pirkhert (student of Anton Halm and Czerny).

He toured Europe as a pianist and, in the process, formed lasting friendships with King George V of Hanover, who was also blind, and with Joseph Joachim, whom he met at Hanover. George named him Royal Chamber Pianist in 1865. In 1866, Labor followed the king's exile and settled in Vienna, where he became a piano teacher, while continuing to compose and perform. In 1875 he also took organ lessons with Johann Evangelist Habert and became a distinguished organist himself. In 1904, Labor received the title Kaiserlich und Königlich Hoforganist (Royal and Imperial Court Organist) and is today best known for his organ works. Labor took a serious interest in early music and wrote continuo elaborations for Heinrich Biber's sonatas.

Labor gave piano lessons to many notable musical personalities, including Alma Schindler (who married Gustav Mahler and others), Paul Wittgenstein, and Arnold Schoenberg. Schindler studied with Labor for six years, beginning when she was 14, and her diaries contain numerous references to him.

Labor was very close to Paul Wittgenstein's family. He attended many musical evenings at the Wittgenstein home with such Viennese musicians of the day as Mahler, Johannes Brahms, Clara Schumann, Bruno Walter, and Richard Strauss. As a composition teacher he gave private lessons to Julius Bittner and Rudolf Braun.

When Paul Wittgenstein lost his right arm in World War I, Labor was the first person he asked to write a piece for piano left hand. They settled on a concerto for piano left hand and orchestra, something for which there was no precedent. (Note: Géza Zichy had actually written a Piano Concerto in E-flat for left hand in 1895, but Labor had probably not written his concerto with Zichy's in mind.) The groundbreaking work premiered on 12 December 1916 in the Musikverein, Vienna, with the Wiener Tonkünstler-Orchester conducted by Oskar Nedbal. Wittgenstein later commissioned works for the left hand from composers including Strauss, Erich Wolfgang Korngold, Maurice Ravel, Sergei Prokofiev, Benjamin Britten, and Franz Schmidt (the finale of Schmidt's A major Clarinet Quintet—the last of his Wittgenstein commissions—is a set of variations on a theme from Labor's clarinet and piano quintet, Op. 11, published in 1901).

Paul's brother, the philosopher and writer Ludwig Wittgenstein, called Labor one of "the six truly great composers", along with Mozart, Haydn, Beethoven, Schubert, and Brahms.

== Selected works ==
- Phantasie über ein Originalthema für 2 Klaviere op 1 (1868)
- Scherzo in Canonform für 2 Klaviere op 2 (1880)
- Quintett für Klavier, Violine, Viola, Violoncello und Kontrabass op 3 (1880)
- Variationen und Fuge über ein Thema von Czerny für Klavier (1890)
- Sonate für Violine und Klavier op. 5 (1892)
- Klavierquartett Nr. 1 C-Dur op. 6 (1893)
- Sonate für Violoncello und Klavier A-Dur op. 7 (1895)
- Fünf Klavierstücke op 8 (1897)
- Phantasie für Orgel über die österreichische Volkshymne op 9 (1898)
- Thema und Variationen für Horn oder Violoncello und Klavier op. 10 (1896)
- Quintett für Klarinette, Violine, Viola, Violoncello und Pianoforte op. 11 (1900)
- Orgel-Phantasie e-moll für zwei Spieler op 12 (1903)
- 2 Improvisationen (Benedicamus domino; Ite missa est) op 13 (?, Print 1912)
- Choralvorspiel über "Wer nur den lieben Gott läßt walten" für Harmonium op 14 (1903)
- Orgelsonate h-moll op. 15 (?, Print 1912)
- Pater noster, Chor, Orgel, Streichorchester op 16 (1876, Print 1912)
- Klavierquartett Nr. 0 B-Dur (1874)
- Streichquartett C-Dur (1888)
- Thema, Variationen und Fuge über eine schottische Tanzweise (Sir Roger de Coverley) für Orchester (1899)
- Big Ben Capriccio für 2 Klaviere (1901)
- "Edward" – Ballade für Gesang und Klavier (1903)
- Konzert für Violine und Orchester G-Dur (1905)
- 17 Praeludien über Intonationen der wichtigsten Choral-Offertorien nach der Editio Vaticana 1908 (1910)
- 6 Kanons für Frauenstimmen (1912)
- 3 Klavierstücke (1912)
- 3 Lieder für gemischten Chor (1912)
- 3 Interludes für Orgel 1914)
- 2. Sonate A-Dur für Klavier und Violine (1914)
- Konzertstück I für Klavier (linke Hand) und Orchester (1915)
- Konzertstück II für Klavier (linke Hand) und Orchester (1916)
- 3. Sonate E-Dur für Klavier (linke Hand) und Violine (1916)
- Klavierquartett Nr. 2 c-moll (1916) (linke Hand)
- Quintett für Oboe, Klarinette, Horn. Fagott und Klavier (linke Hand) (1921)
- Divertimento/Serenade für Flöte, Oboe, Viola, Cello, Klavier (linke Hand) (1923)
- Konzertstück III für Klavier (linke Hand) und Orchester (1923)
