= Carl Ruggles =

American composer (1876–1971)

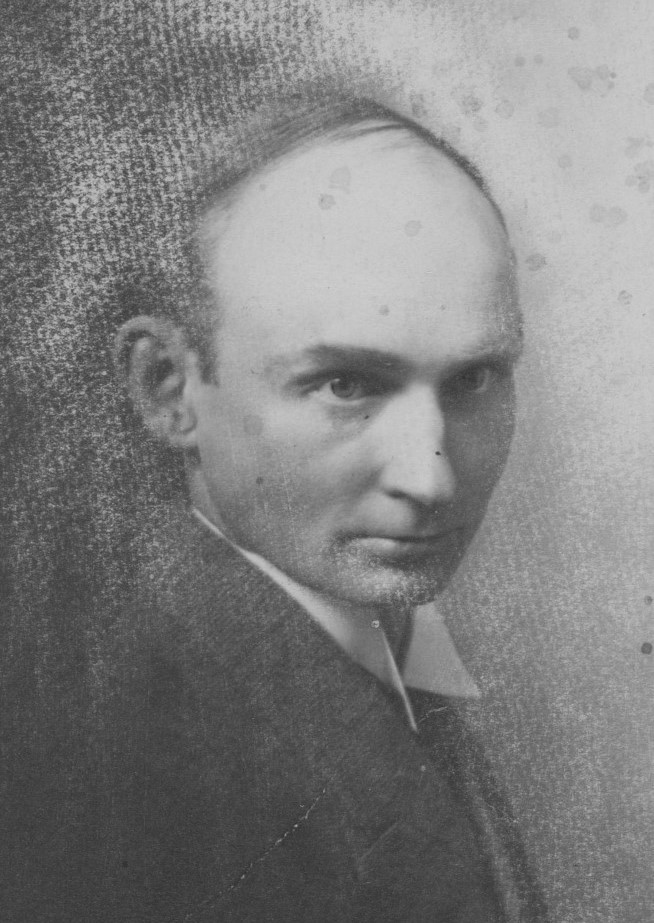
- Detail from a portrait of Ruggles taken in Minnesota, c. 1911
- Born: March 11, 1876; Marion, Massachusetts, USA
- Died: October 24, 1971 (aged 95); Bennington, Vermont, USA
- Occupations: Composer; painter; teacher; violinist
- Notable work: Men and Mountains (1924); Sun-Treader (1926–31)
- Spouse: Charlotte Snell (m. 1906; died 1957)
- Children: 1 (Micah Ruggles)

Signature
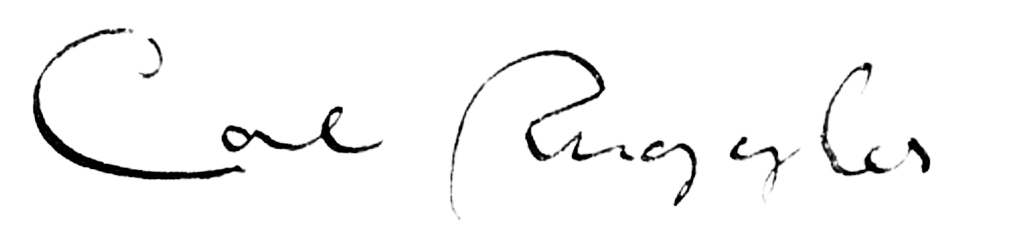

Carl Ruggles (born Charles Sprague Ruggles; March 11, 1876 – October 24, 1971) was an American composer, painter and teacher. His pieces employed "dissonant counterpoint", a term coined by fellow composer and musicologist Charles Seeger to describe Ruggles' music. His method of atonal counterpoint was based on a non-serial technique of avoiding repeating a pitch class until a generally fixed number of eight pitch classes intervened. He is considered a founder of the ultramodernist movement of American composers that included Henry Cowell and Ruth Crawford Seeger, among others. He had no formal musical education, yet was an extreme perfectionist—writing music at a painstakingly slow rate and leaving behind a very small output.

Famous for his prickly personality, Ruggles was nonetheless close friends with Cowell, Seeger, Edgard Varèse, Charles Ives, and the painter Thomas Hart Benton. His students include the experimental composers James Tenney and Merton Brown. Conductor Michael Tilson Thomas has championed Ruggles' music, recording the complete works with the Buffalo Philharmonic and occasionally performing Sun-Treader with the San Francisco Symphony. Especially later in life, Ruggles was also a prolific painter, selling hundreds of paintings during his lifetime.

== Early life ==
=== Childhood ===
Carl Ruggles was born in Marion, Massachusetts on March 11, 1876. His surname comes from the town of Rugeley in Staffordshire, England, whose various inhabitants emigrated to Boston in the year 1637. Many of Ruggles' ancestors served important military and political positions in the early Massachusetts colony, including generals and captains, as well as Micah Haskell Ruggles, a former representative to the Massachusetts General Court (1833–38).

He was born to parents Nathaniel Ruggles and Maria Josephine Ruggles (née Hodge), a native of New Hampshire and step-cousin of former U.S. president Franklin Pierce. The young Carl developed an interest in music early on, crafting his own violin from a cigar box at age six. He recalled his mother, Maria, singing him traditional songs from Stephen C. Foster and other folk hymns. Ruggles would receive a quarter size violin from a local lighthouse keeper, and continued learning to play by ear. According to Ruggles, "I began to play hornpipes and jigs by ear—I couldn't read a note—people would come for miles to hear me play those hornpipes." In 1885, when then-president Grover Cleveland spent a summer at Marion, he would attend one of Ruggles' roadside performances, and the nine year-old Carl played a series of violin duets with first lady Rose Cleveland.

Ruggles' mother Maria died when he was fourteen years old, and he was thereafter raised by his father and grandmother in nearby Lexington. Ruggles' father became an alcoholic after his wife's death, and was rumored to have a gambling addiction that cost most of the family's inherited wealth. Ruggles was never very close to his father and did not see him from the age of 29 onwards. He modified his given name Charles to the more Teutonic Carl at an early age, partially due to his great admiration for German composers, especially Richard Wagner and Richard Strauss. Though he never legally changed it, he signed all documents and works in his adult life "Carl Ruggles". He was appointed director of the YMCA orchestra in 1892. A reviewer wrote: "A musical program of entertainment was rendered in the church, each number of which received hearty applause. Master Charles Ruggles' violin selections were rendered with much feeling and delicacy. He captivated the audience by his manly bearing, and is evidently at home in the concert room."

== Career ==
In 1899, C.W. Thompson & Co. published Ruggles' first compositions, three songs titled How Can I Be Blythe and Glad, At Sea and Maiden with Thy Mouth of Roses. The first song is one of two surviving compositions from his early days; all others are presumed to have been destroyed by Ruggles himself. Eventually Ruggles had to work to support himself as his family's financial situation worsened. He worked a number of odd jobs and started to teach violin and music theory privately, though teaching did not provide much income or success. In 1902 he started writing music criticism for the Belmont Tribune and the Watertown Tribune. This continued until July 1903. Ruggles' reviews are characteristically brash. He did not hesitate to express his opinion, laudatory or not.

In 1906, he met Charlotte Snell, a contralto. Ruggles began a search for steady employment so that he and Charlotte could marry. This led him to Winona, Minnesota, to work for the Mar D'Mar School of Music as a violin teacher. He became active as a soloist as well, eventually directing the Winona Symphony Orchestra. Charlotte joined him as a vocal teacher at Mar d'Mar. Ruggles continued to direct the symphony after the music school closed. Charlotte then was a choir mistress at the First Baptist Church and Ruggles was hired to conduct the YMCA orchestra and glee club. They also took private students.

In 1912 Ruggles moved to New York and began writing an opera based on the German play The Sunken Bell by Gerhart Hauptmann. Due to both his sluggish composing pace and anti-German sentiment as a result of World War I, he never finished the opera, though he submitted a version to the Metropolitan Opera. He destroyed what he had written after he decided he lacked the instinct required for the stage. Ruggles continued to compose, supplementing his income by giving composition lessons. For his son's fourth birthday in 1919 he wrote Toys for soprano and piano, his first composition in his atonal, contrapuntal style.

== Later life and death ==
He continued to live and compose in New York until 1938, when he began teaching composition at the University of Miami, where he remained until 1943. He then moved to a converted one-room school in Vermont where he spent his time revising compositions and painting. He also painted hundreds of paintings over the course of his lifetime and he was offered the opportunity to have one-man shows.

He was elected to membership in the National Institute of Arts and Letters in 1963.

According to Donal Henahan, Ruggles "spoke with an earthiness that shocked many people. He smoked cigars and told dirty stories. He attacked his fellow composers, sneering at almost everyone but Ives. He refused to play the part of the genteel artist." Known for his profanity, Ruggles was also antisemitic. For example, he wrote to Henry Cowell about, "that filthy bunch of Juilliard Jews ... cheap, without dignity, and with little or no talent," especially targeting Arthur Berger. His friend Lou Harrison dissociated himself from Ruggles after the 1949 performance of Angels because of the older composer's racism, noting specifically a luncheon at Pennsylvania Station in New York at which Ruggles shouted anti-black and antisemitic slurs.

=== Death ===
Ruggles' wife died in 1957. They had one son, Micah. Ruggles died in Bennington, Vermont, on October 24, 1971, after a long illness.

== Music ==
=== Overview ===
Ruggles' compositional style was "trial and error. He sat at the piano and moved his fingers around, listened hard to the sounds... shouting out some of the lines." According to Ruggles himself, he never learned any music theory and never analyzed other composers' pieces. The majority of his early works (before Toys) were destroyed, leaving their compositional style a matter of speculation. Reviews suggest similarities to late 19th-century romanticism.

His dissonant, contrapuntal style is similar to Arnold Schoenberg's, although he did not employ the same twelve-tone system. He used a method similar to and perhaps influenced by Charles Seeger's dissonant counterpoint, and generally avoided repeating a pitch class within eight notes. He also never used sprechstimme in any vocal works, although he admired Schoenberg's Pierrot Lunaire. He only completed ten pieces due to his lengthy process of composition and revision.

Sun-Treader, his best known work, is scored for a large orchestra. It was inspired by the poem "Pauline" by Robert Browning, particularly the line "Sun-treader, light and life be thine forever!". (Although Browning does not name him, he was referring to Percy Bysshe Shelley.) The most common intervals in the piece are minor seconds, perfect fourths and augmented fourths. One group of intervals he uses are fourths in sequence where the respective notes are either 13 or 11 semitones apart; the other is three notes which are chromatically related, though often separated by an octave. Another distinctive feature of Sun-Treader is the presence of "waves", both in dynamics and pitch. Pitches will start low, then rise up to a climax, then descend again. Within the ascent (and descent) there are small descents (and ascents) leading to a self-similar (fractal) overall structure. Sun-Treader premiered in Paris on February 25, 1932. Jean Martinon conducted the Boston Symphony Orchestra in its U.S. premiere in Portland, Maine, on January 24, 1966, as part of a Bowdoin College tribute marking Ruggles' 90th birthday.

Ruggles is one of the composers, collectively known as The American Five alongside other American modernist composers Charles Ives (1874–1954), John J. Becker (1886–1961), Wallingford Riegger (1885–1961) and Henry Cowell (1897–1965).

Ruggles's music was published by Theodore Presser Company.

Given the size of his catalogue, Ruggles' discography is not large, with Sun-Treader and Men and Mountains appearing most frequently, usually in anthologies of 20th Century American music. To date, only one album has been devoted to his output alone: The Complete Music of Carl Ruggles, featuring the Buffalo Philharmonic Orchestra conducted by Michael Tilson Thomas, was released in 1980 by CBS Masterworks, and as the title implies, collects all Ruggles' surviving works on two LPs. It was most recently re-released as part of a Thomas retrospective on Sony Classics.

=== Complete list of compositions ===
- Ich fühle deinen Odem (1901), song for soprano and piano (edited by John Kirkpatrick)
- Mood (1918), for violin and piano (incomplete, ed. Kirkpatrick)
- Toys (1919), song for soprano and piano
- Angels (1921), for muted brass (originally for six trumpets; rescored for trumpets and trombones, 1940; transcribed for piano, 1946)
- Men and Angels (1921), for orchestra
- Windy Nights (1921), song for soprano and piano (ed. Kirkpatrick)
- Vox clamans in deserto (1923), for soprano and chamber orchestra
- Men and Mountains (1924), for orchestra
- Prayer (1924), song for soprano and piano (ed. Kirkpatrick)
- Portals (1925), for string orchestra
- Sun-Treader (1926–31), for large orchestra – at 16 minutes, Ruggles' longest and best-known work
- Evocations (1934–43), a set of four pieces existing in two versions, one for solo piano (being revised till 1956) and one for orchestra
- Visions (1935–50), for piano
- March (1943–50), for piano (ed. Kirkpatrick)
- Valse Lente (1945–50), for piano
- Parvum Organum (1945–47), for piano (ed. Kirkpatrick)
- Organum (1946), one version for two pianos, another for orchestra
- Exaltation (1958), his last completed work, a hymn dedicated to the memory of his wife.
