= Denise Tolkowsky =

English-born pianist and composer

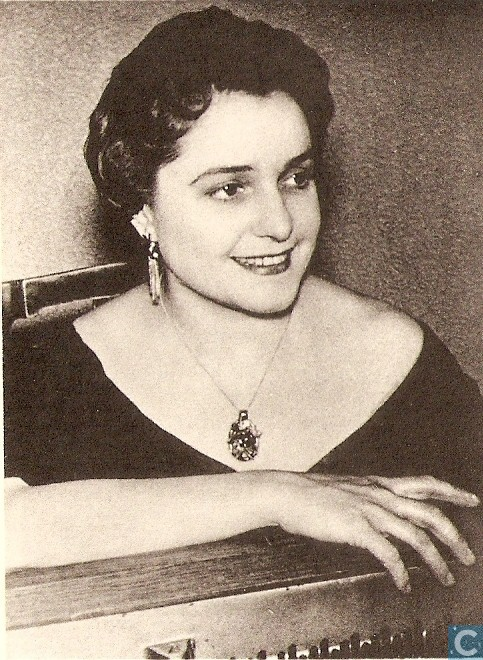
Denise Tolkowsky

Denise Tolkowsky (11 August 1918 – 9 March 1991) was an English-born pianist and composer.

== Biography ==
Denise Tolkowsky was born in Brighton, England, the daughter of a Russian father and Flemish singer and actress Anna Kennes. She studied music at the Royal Flemish Conservatory in Antwerp, with E. Durlet for piano, Edward Verheyden for harmony, Karel Candael for counterpoint and fugue and Flor Alpaerts for composition. She married pianist Alex de Vries and worked as a composer and concert pianist, sometimes performing in a duo with de Vries. He committed suicide in May 1964 and Tolkowsky set up Alex de Vries Fund in his honor, an organization to assist young musicians in starting their careers. Tolkowsky became director of the Flemish region of Yehudi Menuhin's Live Music Now in 1980. She died in Antwerp, Belgium.

== Honors and awards ==
Honors and awards included:

- International dance competition in Brussels, 1931
- International Viotti Competition in Italy, silver medal
- Young Talent competition in Brussels
- Ferris-Tolkowsky Prize
- Anna Kennedy Prize

== Works ==
Tolkowsky wrote for theater, orchestra, chamber ensemble, solo piano and voice. She also wrote a number of songs. Selected works include:

- Van 't kwezelke ballet, 1931
- Le Jeu du Coeur ballet, 1939
- People Of Earth ballet, 1939
- Camp for mezzo soprano and chamber orchestra, text by Marcel Coole, 1939
- Homage to Béla Bartók for flute, violin, piano and percussion, 1950
- Adagio for Strings, 1950
- Sonatine for piano
- Rhythmic for piano
- Etudes for piano
- Preludes for piano
- Variations for piano
- Concerto for piano and orchestra, 1958
- Variations on a Russian theme, 1961
