= Ernest Schuyten =

American classical composer (1881–1974)

Ernest Eugene Schuyten (7 November 1881 – November 1974) was a Belgian-born composer of classical music.

Ernest Schuyten was born in Antwerp (Belgium). He studied first at the Brussels Conservatory under Flor Alpaerts (he graduated in 1900 as a violinist) and later at the Royal Conservatoire of Antwerp (graduated in 1903). In 1910 (other sources give the year 1915) Ernest Schuyten emigrated to the US, settled in New Orleans and later became a naturalized citizen of the United States. He became head of the violin department of the H. Sophie Newcomb Memorial College, conducted the New Orleans Symphony Orchestra and founded in 1916 the Crescent City Symphony. This orchestra emerged later into the New Orleans Philharmonic Symphony.

In 1919 Ernest Schuyten left the H. Sophie Newcomb Memorial College and founded the New Orleans Conservatory of Music and Dramatic Arts. The Conservatory was incorporated in 1932 into the Loyola University New Orleans which formed the College of Music and Ernest Schuyten became its first dean until his retirement in 1953. Under his leadership the college was the first to offer a Bachelor of Music for voice or an instrument. Ernest Schuyten was also the conductor of the Loyola Symphony Orchestra during his time at university.

Ernest Schuyten received different honours for his work, among them are a fellow of the National College of the Dominion of Canada (in 1939) and was decorated as Knight of the Crown of Belgium. Beside his work as a teacher and conductor Ernest Schuyten always composed music which he often premiered with his orchestras. He died in Hammond, Louisiana (United States).

Ernest Schuyten was married to Louise Schuyten and they had one son, Hartwig Schuyten sr. The grandson Hartwig Schuyten jr. and his father both were victims to the Hurricane Camille in 1969.

== Compositions ==
- Piano concerto
- Violin concerto
- Alma Mater (1938)
- Missa Solemnis in Honorem Sancti Georgii (1942)
- Reverie for violin and piano (1944)
- Berceuse for violin and piano (1944)
- Symphony for orchestra (1948, premiered 02.01.1951 at New Orleans with the composer conducting)
- Tone poem for orchestra
- The canticle of love, for orchestra
- Concert march „Loyola Crusaders“
