= John J. Becker =

American composer (1886–1961)

- Undated portrait of Becker
- Born: January 22, 1886; Henderson, Kentucky, U.S.
- Died: January 21, 1961 (aged 74); Wilmette, Illinois, U.S.
- Occupations: Composer; pianist

John Joseph Becker (January 22, 1886 – January 21, 1961) was an American composer of contemporary classical music, a pianist, a conductor, a writer on music, and a music administrator. In the early 1930s he was especially active as a conductor, giving midwestern premieres of works by his close friend Charles Ives, as well as music by fellow American composers Carl Ruggles and Wallingford Riegger.

== Life ==
Becker was born in Henderson, Kentucky, and began his formal musical education at the Cincinnati Conservatory, receiving his diploma in 1905. He then pursued graduate studies at the Wisconsin Conservatory of Music in Milwaukee, where he earned a doctorate in composition in 1923. His composition teachers included Alexander von Fielitz, Carl Busch, and Wilhelm Middelschulte. After a period of comparative obscurity, his career as an educator and administrator began in 1917 at the University of Notre Dame, where he taught for ten years. A devout Catholic, he relocated to another Catholic institution, the College of St. Thomas in St. Paul, Minnesota, where he taught from 1929 until 1933. From 1935 to 1941 he administered the Federal Music Project in Minnesota, and for a time was associate editor of the New Music Quarterly, founded by Henry Cowell, whom he had first met in 1928. He returned to teaching at Barat College in Lake Forest, Illinois from 1943 until his retirement in 1957. His activities diminished with his declining health, and he died in Wilmette, Illinois, one day short of his seventy-fifth birthday in 1961 (Gillespie 2001).

== Legacy ==
The John J. Becker Papers are held by the Music Division of the New York Public Library. Another collection, the Dr. John J. Becker (1886–1961) Papers, is held at the University of St. Thomas Libraries in Minnesota.

== Works ==
- The Abongo, for percussion ensemble (1933)
- Antigone
- At Dieppe
- Chinese Miniatures
- Choral Mass in C Minor
- City of Shagpat
- Concerto Arabesque
- Concerto for Horn and Orchestra
- Concerto for Viola and Orchestra (1937)
- Concerto for Violin and Orchestra
- Concerto Pastoral: A Forest Rhapsodie
- Etude Primitive
- Fantasia Tragica
- Faust
- Favours of the Moon
- Four Poems from the Japanese
- Four Songs
- Heine Song Cycle
- I Fear Thy Kisses
- Improvisation for Organ
- Jesu Dulcis Memoria
- Julius Caesar
- The Lark
- Life of Man
- Little Sleeper, voice and string quartet
- Little Songs
- Magdalen and Judas
- A Marriage with Space
- Martin of Tours
- Mass in Honor of the Sacred Heart
- Mass in Unison or Two Parts
- Mater Admirabilis
- Memory
- Missa Symphonica
- Moments from the Liturgical Year
- Moments from the Passion
- Morning Song
- The Mountains
- My Little Son, Eighteen Months Old
- Naomi the Beautiful
- Nostalgic Songs of the Earth
- O Domino Mea!
- Orchestral Sketches
- Out of the Cradle Endlessly Rocking
- Pater Noster
- Piano Quintette, piano and strings
- The Pool
- Privilege and Privation
- Play by Alfred Kreymborg
- Psalms of Love
- Queen of Cornwall
- Satirico
- Season of Pan
- Separation on the River Kiang
- Seven Last Words
- Sonata in One Movement for Piano
- Sonate American for Violin and Piano
- Soundpiece #1 for Piano and Strings
- Soundpiece #2 "Homage to Haydn" for String Orchestra
- Soundpiece #3
- Soundpiece #4
- Soundpiece #5, A Short Sonata for Piano
- Soundpiece #6, A Short Sonata in One Movement for Flute and Clarinet
- Soundpiece #8
- Stars About the Lovely Moon
- The Snow Goose, Legend of the Second World War, A Passacaglia - Tone *Poem for Large Orchestra
- Symphony #1
- Symphony #2, Fantasia Tragica, A Short Symphony in One Movement
- Symphony #3, Symphonia Brevis
- Symphony #4
- Symphony #5, Homage to Mozart in Two Movements
- Symphony #6
- Symphony #7
- Taking Leave of a Friend
- Tantum Ergo
- The Tempest
- Two Architectural Impressions
- Two Simple Songs
- Two Songs for Voice and Piano
- Unison Mass in Honor of Saint Madeleine Sophie Barat
- Vigilanti
- When the Willow Nods
- You and I together
- You Are Not Here This April
