= Flor Alpaerts =

Belgian conductor, pedagogue and composer

Flor Alpaerts (Antwerp, 12 September 1876 – Antwerp, 5 October 1954) was a Belgian conductor, pedagogue and composer. He graduated from the Vlaamse Muziekschool in 1901.

He was artistic director of the Peter Benoit Foundation, co-director of the Royal Flemish Opera and a member of the Royal Academy of Belgium. As a composer he became the leading Flemish impressionist, with the symphonic poem Pallieter (1921-1924).

Alpaerts left behind an extensive body of work. He first composed in an impressionist style, later expressionist, and finally neo-classical. He drew his inspiration from Flemish life. Peter Benoit was his great model, but he adapted Benoit's principles and gave Flemish music a modern mode of expression and a contemporary face. He wrote above all for the symphony orchestra, but he also wrote incidental music, an opera, many Flemish songs, chamber music and work for brass bands and wind ensembles.

Notable students include the two composers, Denise Tolkowsky and Ernest Schuyten.

== Works ==
- Psyché (1899), symphonic poem
- Herleving (1904)
- Cyrus (1905) inspired by a work by Louis Couperus
- Lentesymfonie (1906)
- Pallieter (1921), symphonic poem
- Benedictus Deus (1926) for mixed choir
- Tijl Uilenspiegel (1927), symphonic poem
- James Ensor-suite (1931), considered his masterpiece
- Salome's dans van de zeven sluiers (Salome's dance of the seven veils)
- Shylock, opera in three acts (1910-1913)

== Sources ==
- Flor Alpaerts at CeBeDeM
