= Eugénie-Victorine-Jeanne Alombert =

French composer and pianist (1874–1964)

Eugénie-Victorine-Jeanne Alombert was a French pianist and composer, during the late-nineteenth to early-twentieth centuries. At least a dozen of Alombert's compositions have been preserved due to the efforts of the Bibliothèque Nationale in Paris, France. Alombert had been a piano teacher, alongside her brief career as a composer. Varying sources, of which there are few, reveal that Alombert's birth and death dates vary between one another, but one website determines her dates to be May 15, 1874 - July 7, 1964.

== Life and career ==
Born on May 15, 1874, Eugénie-Victorine-Jeanne Alombert's mother and father were Marguerite-Gabrielle Ibry (1850-) and Pierre-Edouard-Antony Alombert (1844-). Her father was a clerk of justice and therefore she was a member of the Parisian aristrocracy. She studied with her teachers Mll. Mary Moll and Pompilio Sudessi (1853-1923). This is known due to her dedications in her works Menuet champêtre and Pavane-régence to Mlle. Moll, and Violetta! to M. Pompilio Sudessi, respectively. Alombert's compositions were largely supported by the patronage of a well-established choir director and conductor, Célestin Bourdeau. Bourdeau served as the artistic director at the Casino of Cabourg, and was active in Paris, France. Bourdeau's patronage extended to local composers who could hire an orchestra he formed primarily to read new compositions, this is identified by a news article published by the Revue du monde musical et dramatique, which describes the service and its cost of one hundred francs. Alombert would marry Louis Besson (1845-1891) in the year 1888. Besson was a well-known music critic, as well as a composer and librettist. He was also the editor of L'Événement. After Besson's death, Alombert would remarry in the year 1900, to René-Louis-Joseph-Henri de Sévelinges. Sévelinges was an architect and the son of Omer-Oscar and Henriette-Pauline-Emilie Taveau, a family of nobility. The dates of Alombert's surviving compositions range between 1893 and 1895, and her career as a piano teacher ended in 1899.
