= Camillo Schumann =

German composer and organist

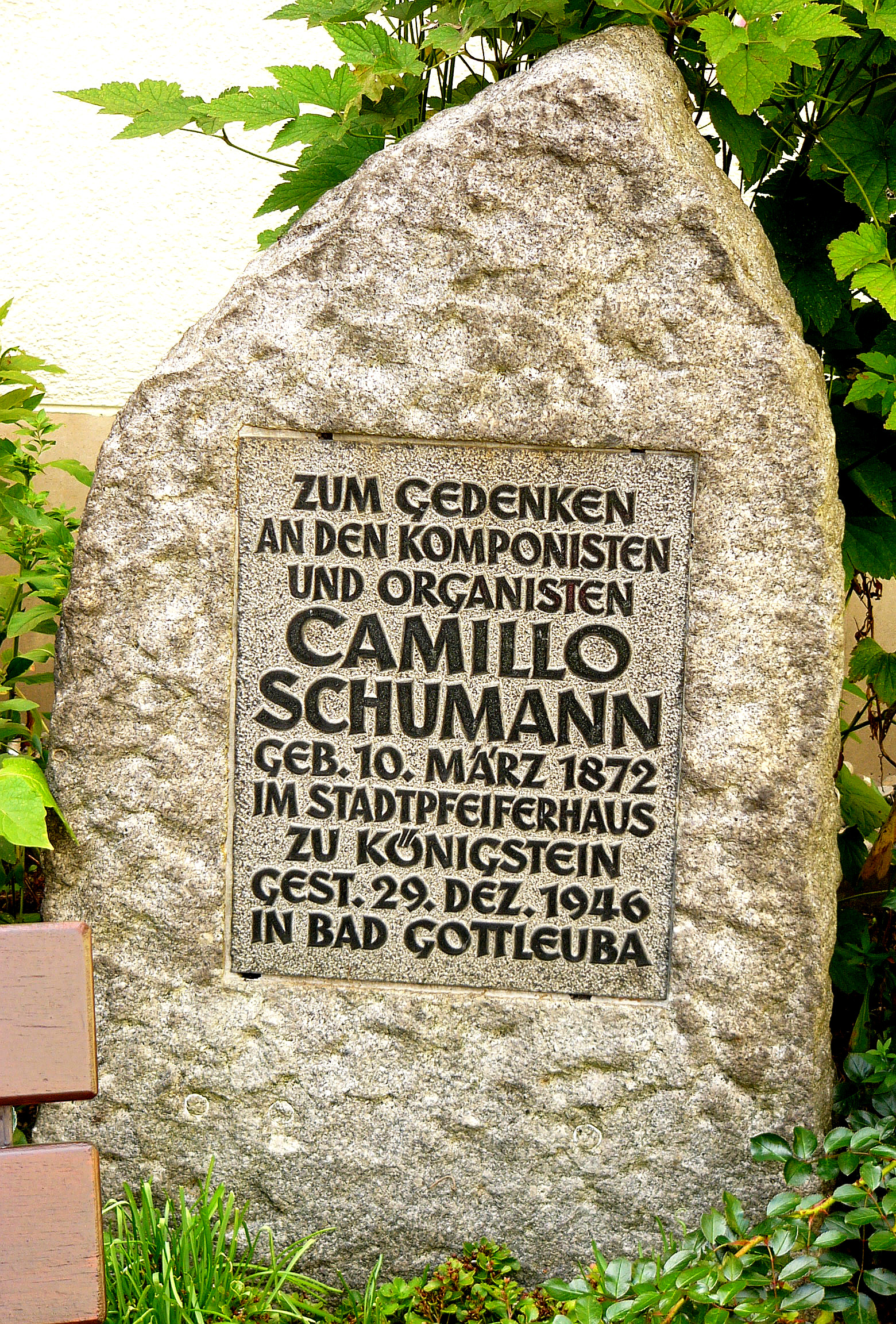
Memorial stone for Camillo Schumann in Königstein, erected in 1972

Camillo Schumann (10 March 1872 – 29 December 1946) was a German late Romantic composer and organist.

== Life ==
Schumann was born in Königstein as one of twelve children of the city music director Clemens Schumann sen. (1839‍–‍1918) and his wife Camilla Ottilie, née Müller. His elder brother was the composer Georg Schumann; other siblings were Alfred Schumann (1868‍–‍1891), latterly concertmaster with the Bremer Philharmoniker, and Clemens Schumann jun. (1876‍–‍1938), violinist in the Dresden Staatskapelle from 1900 to 1936.

Schumann received his first lessons, as did his brothers, from his father and learned to play several instruments during his early childhood. From 1889 to 1893, he was trained first for a short time at the Hochschule für Musik Carl Maria von Weber Dresden, then at the Hochschule für Musik und Theater Leipzig with Carl Reinecke, Salomon Jadassohn, Bruno Zwintscher, Paul Homeyer and others. In 1894 and 1895, he studied with Woldemar Bargiel and Robert Radecke at the Royal Music Institute of Berlin.

During his time in Berlin, Schumann worked as a substitute organist in several larger churches. On 1 October 1896 he took up the post of full-time organist at the Hauptkirche St. Georg in Eisenach and at the Wartburg Chapel there. In 1906 he was awarded the title of Grand Ducal Saxon Music Director and Court Organist.

Schumann organised numerous organ and chamber concerts in Eisenach – sometimes with the participation of his brothers Georg and Clemens Jr. – and was particularly committed to cultivating the music of Johann Sebastian Bach in his native city.

In April 1914, he moved to Bad Gottleuba, took on a few more church music engagements near his home, but increasingly devoted himself to his compositional work away from courtly duties. Schumann died here on 29 December 1946 at the age of 74. His grave still exists today. In 1972, a headstone was erected in his memory in his native town of Königstein.

== Works ==
=== Cello sonatas ===
- Cello Sonata No. 1 op. 59 (first edition published by Breitkopf & Härtel, Wiesbaden 2017)
- Cello Sonata No. 2 op. 99 (first edition published by Breitkopf & Härtel, Wiesbaden 2017)
- Cello Sonata No. 3 op. 118a

=== Choral works ===
- Mägdlein saß im Wald und Moos op. 25
- Six cheerful songs op. 33
- Five songs op. 37a
- Psalm of Praise op. 70
- Six Songs op. 73
- Two choruses op. 87

=== Duets ===
- Moment musical op. 15
- Two Recital Pieces for Violin and Piano op. 17
- Larghetto op. 19
- Barcarole op. 21
- Fantasy piece for oboe and piano op. 31
- Two pieces for violin and piano op. 35
- Three Fantasy Pieces for Clarinet and Piano op. 74
- Three Recital Pieces for French Horn and Piano op. 82
- Andante and Humoresque op. 95
- Four Pieces for Violin and Organ op. 109
- Three Pieces for Violin and Piano op. 122
- Three Pieces for Oboe and Piano op. 126a
- Six Pieces for Violin and Piano op. 139
- Two Pieces for Violin and Piano op. 146
- Three Recital Pieces for Violin and Piano o.op.
- Two Pieces for Violin and Piano o.op.
- Eight small recital pieces for violin and piano o.op.
- Two Pieces for Violoncello and Piano o.op.
- Two Pieces for Clarinet and Piano o.op.
- Two Pieces for Violin and Piano o.op.
- Six easy recital pieces for flute and piano o.op.
- Ten Recital Pieces for 2 Soprano or Tenor Recorders o.op.
- Four Recital Pieces for alto flute and piano o.op.
- Three Recital Pieces for 2 Soprano or Tenor Recorders o.op.
- Andantino o.op.
- Pastorale o.op.

=== Flute Sonata ===
- Flute Sonata op. 123a

=== Fugue ===
- Six fugues for organ o.op.

=== Horn sonatas ===
- Horn Sonata No. 1 op. 118b (first edition published by Pfefferkorn Musikverlag, Leipzig 2015).
- Horn Sonata No. 2 o.op. (first edition published by Pfefferkorn Musikverlag, Leipzig 2015)

=== Intermezzi ===
- Five Intermezzi op. 91

=== Other chamber music ===
- Two pieces for cor anglais op. 80
- 2 Solo Pieces for Violin op. 96
- Recitative and Romance op. 126b
- Three pieces for solo violin op. 132
- Pastorale o.op.
- Recitative and Adagio op. 9
- Andante cantabile op. 3
- Andante cantabile sostenuto o.op.
- Andante sostenuto o.op.

=== Clarinet sonatas ===
- Clarinet Sonata No. 1 in B flat major op. 112 (first edition published by Pfefferkorn Musikverlag, Leipzig 2015).
- Clarinet Sonata No. 2 in E flat major op. 134 (first edition published by Pfefferkorn Musikverlag, Leipzig 2015)
- Clarinet Sonata No. 3 A flat major o.op. (fragment)
- Clarinet Sonata No. 4 A major o. op.

=== Piano works ===
- Six characteristic fantasy pieces op. 12a
- Five little instructive piano pieces for the youth op. 14
- Three piano pieces op. 15a
- Eight lyrical tone pieces in waltz form op. 18
- Sketches from the Thuringian Forest op. 23
- Six little recital pieces for the youth op. 28
- Ten Piano Pieces op. 39
- Four Piano Pieces op. 45a
- Eight Fantasy Pieces op. 45b
- The Seasons op. 56
- Six Piano Pieces op. 63
- Five Piano Pieces op. 66
- House Music op. 71
- Two Little Instructive Christmas Fantasies op. 86
- Eight Fantasy Pieces op. 97
- Four Piano Pieces op. 102
- Piano Pieces op. 116
- Four Piano Pieces op. 120
- Five Piano Pieces op. 127
- Six Piano Pieces op. 129
- Eight Piano Pieces op. 136
- Five Piano Pieces op. 141
- Six Piano Pieces to Thekla op. 145
- Four Piano Pieces op. 149
- Albumblatt o.op.
- Song without Words o.op.
- Miscellen o.op.
- Three Character Pieces o.op.
- Hausmusik o.op.
- Six Character Pieces o.op.
- Twelve Recital Pieces o.op.
- Six Piano Pieces o.op.
- Six Easy Pieces o.op.
- Twelve Character Pieces o.op.
- Four Piano Pieces o.op.
- Eight Piano Pieces (Booklet 1) o.op.
- Eight Piano Pieces (Booklet 2) o.op.
- Dance Tunes o.op.
- Eight Fantasy Pieces o.op.
- Piano Pieces o.op.
- Scherzo for piano o.op.

=== Piano Sonata ===
- Sonatina for piano o.op.

=== Piano trios ===
- Piano Trio No. 1 op. 34
- Piano Trio No. 2 op. 88
- Piano Trio No. 3 op. 93

=== Concert pieces ===
- Four Concert Pieces op. 6
- Three Concert Pieces op. 7
- Two Concert Pieces op. 14a
- Two Concert Pieces op. 20
- Three Concert Pieces op. 26a
- Two Concert Pieces op. 85
- Three Concert Pieces op. 89
- Two Concert Pieces op. 158

=== Songs ===
- Three Songs op. 1
- Three sacred songs op. 11
- Two Songs op. 13
- Evening Celebration o.op.
- 15 selected songs o.op.

=== Marches ===
- March for 2 recorders and violin o.op.
- Little March o.op.
- Solemn March o.op.

=== Mazurka ===
- Mazurka op. 42

=== Minuet ===
- Minuet from Suite No. 2 op. 30

=== Notturni ===
- Notturno op. 24
- Notturno op. 45

=== Oboe Sonata ===
- Oboe Sonata op. 105

=== Other orchestral works ===
- Larghetto op. 19a
- Andante and Capriccio op. 36
- Three Pieces for String Orchestra op. 44
- Fantasiestück for violin and small orchestra o.op.
- Recitative for Violoncello and Orchestra o.op.
- Fantasy Piece for Clarinet and Orchestra o.op.
- Symphonic Andante cantabile o.op.
- Capriccio for flute and string orchestra o.op.

=== Organ works ===
- Organ Sonata No. 1 op. 12 in D minor
- Organ Sonata No. 2 op. 16 B flat major
- Organ Sonata No. 3 op. 29 in C minor
- Organ Sonata No. 4 op. 67 F major
- Organ Sonata No. 5 op. 40 in G minor (in the manuscript: op. 87)
- Organ Sonata No. 6 op. 110 in A minor
- Two chorale fantasies op. 8
- Fantasy and Fugue on "Eine feste Burg" op. 10
- Postlude to the song "O dass ich tausend Zungen hätte" op. 22
- Four light sustained recital pieces op. 83
- Concert Prelude and Fugue on the Choral "Nun danket alle Gott" op. 100
- Two Preludes and Fugues op. 123
- Adagio for Violoncello and Organ o.op.
- Choral Preludes op. 126
- Choral Preludes op. 131
- Choral Preludes op. 135
- Ten Choral Preludes op. 142
- Choral Preludes op. 148
- Twelve chorale preludes o.op.
- Fourteen chorale preludes o.op.
- Fourteen easy chorale preludes o.op.
- Choral Preludes o.op.
- Ten chorale preludes o.op.
- Elegy for violin and organ o.op.

=== Harmonium works ===
- Suite in F major for harmonium, 1905 op. 26
- Minuet from Suite No. 2 for Harmonium, 1908 op. 30
- Suite No. 2 in D major for harmonium, 1908 op. 37
- Suite No. 3 in F minor for Harmonium, 1911 op. 43
- 4 light sustained recital pieces for organ (also harmonium) op. 83
- Sonata for Harmonium op. 103
- Choral Preludes for Harmonium, 1917 op. 148
- Suite for Harmonium, 1942 o. op.

=== Polonaises ===
- Polonaise in B minor op. 4
- Polonaise op. 64

=== Prelude ===
- Festive Prelude in March Form op. 2

=== Quartets ===
- Four small recital pieces o.op.
- Two pieces for 2 tenor flutes and 2 violins o.op.
- Two songs o.op.

=== Romances ===
- Romance for viola and piano op. 14b
- Romance for clarinet and piano op. 43a
- Romance for Violin and Piano op. 118
- Romance for Violin and Orchestra o.op.
- Romance o.op.
- Romance for Violoncello and Piano o.op.
- Romance for Clarinet and Piano o.op.
- Romance for bassoon and piano o.op.

=== Serenades ===
- Serenade for clarinet and piano o.op.
- Serenade for flute and string orchestra o.op.

=== Sonata ===
- Sonata for Harmonium op. 103

=== String quartets ===
- String Quartet in C minor op. 41
- Two Pieces for String Quartet o.op.
- String Quartet in D major o.op.

=== Suites ===
- Suite concertante op. 13a
- Suite No. 1 for Harmonium op. 26
- Suite No. 2 for Harmonium op. 37
- Suite No. 3 for Harmonium op. 43
- Suite for piano 4 hands op. 50
- Suite for Clarinet and Piano op. 102a
- Suite No. 4 for Harmonium op. 119
- Suite for English Horn and Piano op. 129a
- Suite for piano op. 144
- Suite No. 5 for Harmonium op. 157
- Suite in G minor o.op.
- Suite for Harmonium o.op.

=== Dance ===
- Six German Waltzes op. 62

=== Trios ===
- Three Recital Pieces o.op.
- Eight little pieces for 2 recorders and violin o.op.

=== Variations ===
- Choral variations and fugue to the chorale "Befiehl du deine Wege" op. 106
- Theme and twelve variations for piano o.op.

=== Violin Concerto ===
- Violin Concerto in D minor op. 27

=== Violin sonatas ===
- Violin Sonata No. 2 op. 40a
- Violin Sonata No. 3 op. 78
- Violin Sonata No. 4 op. 124
- Violin Sonata No. 5 op. 151
- Violin Sonata No. 1 o.op.
