= Georg Schumann (composer) =

German composer (1866–1952)

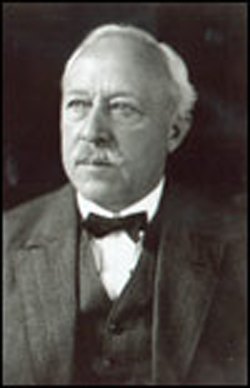
- Georg Schumann in 1950
- Born: 25 October 1866
- Died: 23 May 1952 (aged 85)
- Occupation: Composer

Georg Alfred Schumann (German: [ˈɡeː.ɔʁk ˈʃuː.man]; 25 October 1866 – 23 May 1952) was a German composer and director of the Sing-Akademie zu Berlin.

== Life ==
Schumann was born at Königstein. He was the son of Clemens Schumann (1839–1918) and the older brother of Camillo Schumann. He first studied the violin and organ with his father and grandfather, and was taught by Friedrich Baumfelder, a well-known German composer, pianist, and conductor of his day. He later was a student at the Leipzig Conservatory for seven years, conducted an orchestra at Danzig from 1891–1896 and from 1896-1899 the orchestra at Bremen. In 1900 he became professor and director at the Sing-Akademie zu Berlin. In 1907 he became a member of the Prussian Academy of Arts, in 1918 vice-president and finally in 1934 President.

== Works (selection) ==
- Symphonies:
  - Symphony No. 1, "Preis-Symphonie" in B minor (1887)
  - Symphony No. 2 in F minor, Op. 42 (1905)
- Other orchestral works:
  - Amor und Psyche, Op. 3 (1888) for soloists, choir and orchestra
  - Celebration overture in C minor, Op.48 (1939)
  - Joy of Life overture, Op. 54 (1911)
  - Im Ringen um ein Ideal, symphonic poem Op. 66 (1916)
  - Orchestral Variations on Vetter Michel, Op. 74 (1930)
  - Ouvertüre zu einem Drama, Op. 45 (1906)
  - Serenade for Large Orchestra, Op. 34 (1902)
  - Symphonische Variationen über den Choral Wer nur den lieben Gott lässt walten, Op. 24 (1900)
  - Variations and Gigue on Handel's "The Harmonious Blacksmith" for large orchestra, Op. 72 (1925)
- Choral music:
  - Ruth op. 50 (1908)
  - Songs of Hiob, Op. 60 (1914)
- Chamber Music
  - Violin Sonata No. 1 in C-Sharp minor, Op. 12 (1896)
  - Cello Sonata in E minor, Op. 19 (1898)
  - Piano Quartet in F minor, Op. 29 (1901)
  - Piano Quintet No. 1 in E minor, Op. 18 (1898)
  - Piano Quintet No. 2 in F minor, Op. 49 (1909)
  - Piano Trio No. 1 in F major, Op. 25 (1900)
  - Piano Trio No. 2 in F major, Op. 62 (1915)
- Piano Music:
  - Drei Stücke, Op. 1
  - Stimmungsbilder, Op. 2 (1886)
  - Traumbilder, Op. 4 (1890)
  - Improvisationen, Op. 7 (1892)
  - Drei Stücke, Op. 23
  - Sechs Fantasien, Op. 36
  - Ballade, Op. 65

== Recordings ==
- Piano Trios Nos. 1 & 2. Recorded by the Münchner Klaviertrio and released on cpo (777 712-2) in 2011.
- Symphony No. 1 (Preis-Symphonie) and Serenade for Large Orchestra were released on cpo 3066793 in 2012.
- Lieder. Recorded by Mary Nelson (soprano) and Mark Ford (piano) and released on Stone Records (B077MT8H1C) in 2017.
