= Rudolf Braun (composer) =

Austrian pianist and composer

Rudolf Braun (21 October 1869 – 30 December 1925) was an Austrian pianist and composer who was born congenitally blind. He was born and died in Vienna.

Very little is recorded of Braun's early life. He was educated at the School for the Blind. He earned his living nearly exclusively from music, and at the age of 12, he gave a performance as a pianist at a concert of the Vienna Men's Choral Society. On 3 March 1896 he gave a concert of his own compositions. Gustav Mahler premiered Braun's Marionettentreuse at the Vienna Court Opera on 17 October 1906, to excellent reviews. In 1925 the title of Professor was bestowed on him. In 1923 Arnold Schoenberg used his influence to obtain financial assistance for some struggling composers, including Braun, Alban Berg, Anton Webern and Josef Matthias Hauer.

Braun wrote seven works for the one-armed pianist Paul Wittgenstein, including a Piano Concerto in A minor for the Left Hand. This concerto was written in 1924 and was first performed on 12 December 1927, almost two years after his death, with Wittgenstein as soloist and Julius Lehnert conducting. The Concerto in A minor is the only concerto Braun wrote and is unique in the fact that the cadenza of the work is located near the end of the piece. Influences of Schumann, Grieg, Richard Strauss and Tchaikovsky are prevalent throughout this work. Wittgenstein, who owned this work outright, performed this piece four times: twice in Vienna in 1927 and 1929 with the Vienna Women's Symphony (Julius Lehnert conducting) and twice in the Netherlands in October/November 1930 with the Arnhemshe Orkestvereeniging with Martin Spanjaard conducting.

From a review of the Concerto in A minor from the Dutch archives in 1930, the following can be extracted: "The concerto written by Rudolf Braun for Paul Wittgenstein is not exceptionally original or personal. The concerto breathes the spirit of Schumann, and reminds one of Tschaikowsky (in the beginning) and Grieg (in the final movement). The beginning of this concerto promises more than the rest gives. Extraordinary is the transfer of the Cadenza to the last movement."

== Known works ==
- Fünf Lieder, Op. 3, pub. 1897
- Drei Klavierstücke, Op. 16: Valse caprice, Gedenkblatt, Maiglöckchen
- String Quintet in E minor, Op. 38, pub. 1912, Vienna
- Wind Quintet in C major, 1920
- Cello Sonata in E minor, pub. 1926; inscribed "In freundschaftlicher Erinnerung an Frau Senta Jölly – Klagenfurt"
- Piano Concerto in A minor for the Left Hand; written for Paul Wittgenstein; first performed 31 October 1927 with the Vienna Women's Symphony Orchestra, Julius Lehnert conducting
- Three Piano Pieces for the Left Hand: Scherzo, Perpetuum Mobile, Serenata; dedicated to Wittgenstein; 1922, pub. 1928
- Divertimento for Two Pianos
- Die Tänzerin under die Marionette, a pantomime with a scenario by Max Mell.

== External sources ==
- Free scores by Rudolf Braun (composer) at the International Music Score Library Project (IMSLP)
