= Ernst Haberbier =

German composer, pianist and music teacher (1813–1869)

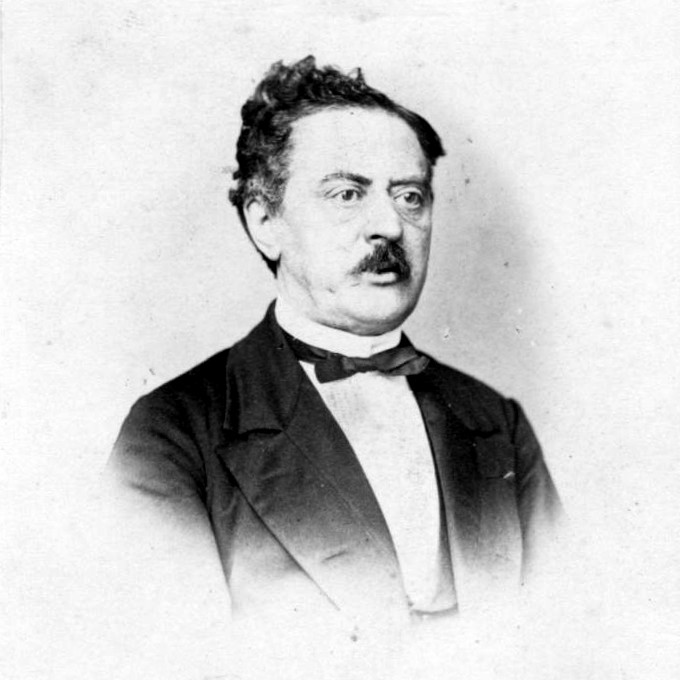
Portrait of Ernst Haberbier

Ernst Haberbier (5 October 1813 – 12 March 1869) was a German composer, pianist and music teacher.

== Biography ==
Ernst Haberbier was born in 1813 in Königsberg. He studied the piano with his father who was an organist. When he was nineteen he left Königsberg and moved to Saint Petersburg. There he became famous as a concert pianist and as a teacher. He became the Imperial Court Pianist in 1847. Around 1850 he moved to Christiania to work on his technique. He gave concerts around Europe until 1866. Then he moved to Bergen and became a teacher. He died 1869 while he was playing a concert. As a composer, Haberbier was best known for his piano music. Two sets of pieces called Études-Poésies (Op 53 and Op 59) were very popular. They are still sometimes played today.
