= Wallingford Riegger =

American music composer

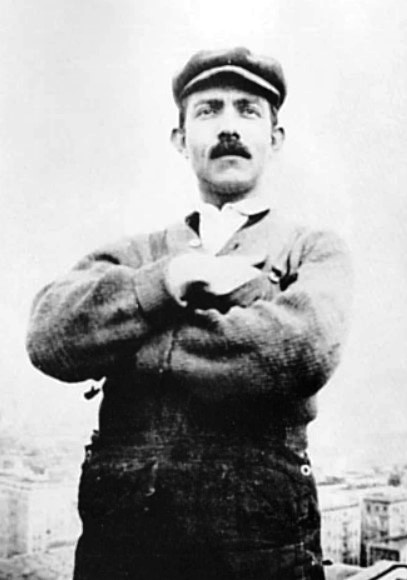
- Riegger in New York City, c. 1930s
- Born: April 29, 1885; Albany, Georgia, U.S.
- Died: February 4, 1961 (aged 75); New York, New York, U.S.
- Occupations: Composer; pianist; teacher
- Spouse: Rose Schramm (m. 1911)
- Children: 3
- Relatives: Neira Riegger (sister-in-law)

Wallingford Constantine Riegger (US: /ˈriɡər/ REE-gur; April 29, 1885 – April 2, 1961) was an American modernist composer and pianist, best known for his orchestral and modern dance music. He was born in Albany, Georgia, but spent most of his career in New York City, helping elevate the status of other American composers such as Charles Ives and Henry Cowell. Riegger is noted for being one of the first American composers to use a form of serialism and the twelve-tone technique.

== Life ==
Riegger was born in 1885 to Constantine Riegger and Ida Riegger (née Wallingford). After his father's lumber mill burned down in 1888, his family moved to Indianapolis, and later to Louisville, finally settling in New York in 1900. A gifted cellist, he was a member of the first graduating class of the Institute of Musical Art, later known as the Juilliard School, in 1907, after studying under Percy Goetschius. He continued his studies at the Hochschule für Musik in Berlin for three years. After returning in 1910, he married Rose Schramm in 1911, with whom he later had three daughters. He returned to Germany and served in various conducting positions until the United States entered World War I in 1917, after which he moved back to America.

From 1918 to 1922, he taught music theory and violoncello at Drake University in Des Moines, Iowa. On August 15, 1922, Riegger was arrested on charges of being the highly-publicized "nude maniac" that had made appearances around the city for several months, sometimes approaching young women and in one instance performing a dance in clogs in the University Place district. The following day, Drake University's president said "while Riegger will undoubtedly sever his connections with the institution there has been no action by the board of trustees in the case". Meanwhile, Riegger called newspaper accounts of his arrest "grossly false and fantastic" and denied the "nude maniac" label, calling the situation a "regrettable accident". Riegger's trial was delayed due to his stay in a sanitarium for several weeks. Many years later, a British scholar traveled to Des Moines to investigate, and found no record of a conviction and suggested Riegger left town in September.

During the greater part of the time from 1930 to 1956, he continued to compose and publish while he taught at various colleges in New York State, notably the Institute of Musical Art and Ithaca College. In 1957, he was called before the House Un-American Activities Committee, which was investigating communism in the musical world. In 1958, Leonard Bernstein honored him by conducting his Music for Orchestra with the New York Philharmonic Orchestra. He died in New York in 1961 when he tripped over the leashes of two fighting dogs, resulting in a fall and a head injury from which he did not recover despite treatment. Bernstein said of him in his eulogy, "All who knew Wally loved him."

His students included Morton Feldman, Robert Ashley, Louise Spizizen, Alan Stout, Merton Brown, Leifur Þórarinsson and David Behrman. See: List of music students by teacher: R to S#Wallingford Riegger.

== Musical style ==
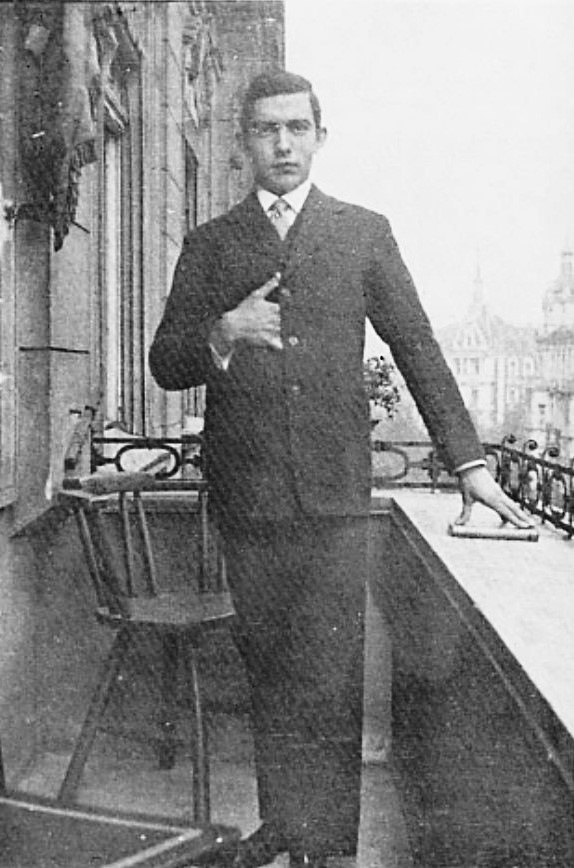
Wallingford Riegger in Berlin, c. 1908

Riegger was known for his use of a twelve-tone system, related to that of Schoenberg. He became familiar with the technique through Schoenberg's American student Adolph Weiss. However, he did not use it in all of his compositions and his usage varied from that of Schoenberg, for example in not always using rows with twelve tones and not using transposed forms of the rows. Riegger's Dance Rhythms, for example, did not use these techniques. Aside from Schoenberg, Riegger was also significantly influenced by his friends Henry Cowell and Charles Ives.

=== Early period ===
Early on in his career as a composer, the style of his compositions was markedly different from that of his later work, which mostly used the twelve-tone system. His compositions, following those of Goetschius, were somewhat romanticist.

=== Later period ===
Starting in the mid-1930s, Riegger began to write contemporary dance music. Later, as his career progressed, he began to use Schoenberg's twelve-tone technique more and more often, though he did occasionally revert to his earlier styles. From 1941 on, he focused almost solely on instrumental music. His Symphony No. 3 received the New York Music Critics' Circle Award and a Naumburg Foundation Recording Award.

== Selected works ==
Orchestral

- Fantasy and Fugue, Op. 10 (1930)
- Dichotomy, Op. 12 (1931)
- Consummation, Op. 31 (1939)
- Passacaglia and Fugue, Op. 34a (1942)
- Symphony No. 1 (1944)
- Symphony No. 2 (1945)
- Symphony No. 3, Op. 42 (1946–1947, revised 1960)
- Music for Orchestra, Op. 50 (1958)
- Suite for Younger Orchestras, Op. 56 (1953)
- Romanza for string orchestra, Op. 56a (1953); Lullaby from the Suite for Younger Orchestras
- Dance Rhythms, Op. 58 (1954)
- Overture, Op. 60 (1955)
- Preamble and Fugue, Op. 61 (1955)
- Symphony No. 4, Op. 63 (1956)
- Festival Overture, Op. 68 (1957)
- Quintuple Jazz, Op. 72 (1958)
- Sinfonietta, Op. 73 (1959)
- Canon and Fugue for string orchestra

Concert band and wind ensemble

- Ballet for Band, Op. 18 (1935)
- Passacaglia and Fugue, Op. 34 (1942)
- Processional, Op. 36 (1943)
- Music for Brass Choir, Op. 45 (1949)
- Prelude and Fugue, Op. 52 (1953)
- Dance Rhythms, Op. 58a (1954); original for orchestra

Concertante

- Elegy for cello and orchestra (1916)
- Concerto for piano with wind quintet, Op. 53 (1953)
- Variations for piano and orchestra, Op. 54 (1952–1953)
- Variations for violin and orchestra, Op. 71 (1959)
- Introduction and Fugue for cello and concert band, Op. 74 (1960)

Chamber music

- Divertissement for harp, flute, cello
- Elegy for viola and piano (1915)
- Piano Trio in B minor, Op. 1 (1919)
- Revery for cello (or viola) and piano (1920)
- Lullaby for cello (or viola) and piano (1922)
- Study in Sonority for 10 violins or any multiple thereof, Op. 7 (1927)
- Suite for flute solo, Op. 8 (1929)
- String Quartet No. 1, Op. 30 (1938–1939)
- Duos for Three Woodwinds for flute, oboe, clarinet, Op. 35 (1944)
- Sonatina for violin and piano, Op. 39 (1948)
- String Quartet No. 2, Op. 43 (1948)
- Piano Quintet, Op. 47 (1951)
- Nonet for Brass, Op. 49 (1951)
- Woodwind Quintet, Op. 51 (1952)
- Variations for violin and viola (soli or in choirs), Op. 57 (1956)
- Etudes for clarinet solo (1957)
- String Quartet No. 3 (1957)
- Movement for 2 trumpets, trombone and piano, Op. 66
- Introduction and Fugue for 4 cellos or cello orchestra, Op. 69 (1962)

Piano

- Blue Voyage, Rhapsody, Op. 6 (1927)
- New Dance for 2 pianos (1932)
- The Cry for piano 4-hands, Op. 22 (1935)
- Four Tone Pictures (1939)
- New and Old, Op. 38 (1944)
- Petite Étude, Op. 62 (1956)
- Evocation for piano 4-hands, Op. 17
- Scherzo for 2 pianos
- Skip to My Lou, Duet for 2 pianos
- The Galway Piper, Duet for 2 pianos
- The Harold Flammer Duet Album, Folk Songs arranged for piano 4-hands

Accordion

- Cooper Square

Vocal

- La Belle Dame sans Merci (setting of John Keats' poem, for two sopranos, contralto, tenor, violin, viola, cello, double bass, oboe (English horn), clarinet and French horn; premiered 19 September 1924, at the 7th Berkshire Festival of Chamber Music)

Choral

- Dark Eyes, Russian Folksong, SSA, piano
- Veni Jesu (arrangement)
