= List of Japanese composers =

This is a list of Japanese composers, arranged by the field in which each is best known and, within each section, in order of birth year.

Western art music reached Japan in earnest only after the Meiji Restoration of 1868, when the new government introduced Western-style music into the school curriculum and into the army and navy bands. The first generation of Japanese composers therefore wrote mainly shōka (school songs) and marches; a fully professional concert-music tradition emerged in the 1920s and 1930s around Kōsaku Yamada and the composers of the Shinkō Sakkyokuka Renmei. Since the 1950s Japanese composers have also become internationally prominent in film, television, animation and video game music, and those fields are listed separately below.

Inclusion criteria: entries should be composers who are the subject of an existing Wikipedia article, or whose notability is supported by an inline citation. Composers active in more than one field are listed once, in the section for which they are best known, with cross-references where useful. An empty death-year field indicates a living composer. Where reliable sources disagree on a date, the alternatives are noted.

Birth and death years in this list have been checked against the Japanese Wikipedia list of Japanese classical composers and against the sources cited for individual entries.

== Pre-Meiji and traditional Japanese music ==
Composers working within the indigenous hōgaku traditions (koto, shakuhachi, shamisen, gagaku and related genres).

- Yatsuhashi Kengyo (1614–1685) – koto composer; credited with Rokudan no Shirabe and with establishing the modern hirajōshi tuning
- Hiromori Hayashi (1831–1896) – gagaku musician of the Imperial Court; associated with the melody of "Kimigayo"
- Nakao Tozan (1876–1956) – founder of the Tozan-ryū school of shakuhachi
- Michio Miyagi (1894–1956) – koto composer and performer; "Haru no Umi" (1929)
- Yasuo Kuwahara (1946–2003) – composer for mandolin orchestra

== Shōka, art song and children's song ==
Composers active chiefly in shōka (Meiji-era school song), dōyō (children's song) and Japanese art song. Those marked with an asterisk also appear in the classical table below.

- Isawa Shūji (1851–1917) – educator; head of the Music Study Committee (Ongaku Torishirabe Gakari), which introduced Western music into Japanese schools
- Sakunosuke Koyama (1864–1927) – "Natsu wa Kinu" (1896)
- Tokichi Setoguchi (1868–1941) – naval bandmaster; "Warship March" (1897)
- Nobu Kōda (1870–1946)*
- Teiichi Okano (1878–1941) – "Furusato" (1914), "Momiji" (1911)
- Rentarō Taki (1879–1903) – "Kōjō no Tsuki" (1901), Minuet in B minor (1900)
- Tadashi Yanada (1883–1959) – "Aoi Me no Ningyō" (1921)
- Nagayo Motoori (1885–1945) – "Shabondama" (1922)
- Kōsaku Yamada (1886–1965)* – "Akatombo" (1927)
- Kiyoshi Nobutoki (1887–1965) – "Umi Yukaba" (1937); cantata "Kaidō Tōsei" (1940)
- Shinpei Nakayama (1887–1952) – "Kachūsha no Uta" (1914), "Sendō Kouta" (1921)
- Ryūtarō Hirota (1892–1952) – "Hamachidori" (1919)
- Tamezō Narita (1893–1945) – "Hamabe no Uta" (1916)
- Kan'ichi Shimofusa (1898–1962)*
- Yūji Koseki (1909–1989)* – Tokyo Olympic March (1964)
- Yoshinao Nakada (1923–2000)* – "Chiisai Aki Mitsuketa" (1955)

== Classical and contemporary concert music ==
Sorted by birth year; the table can also be re-sorted by clicking the column headers.

Name	Birth year	Death year	Prominent works and notes
Nobu Kōda	1870	1946	Violin Sonata in E-flat major (1895), Violin Sonata in D minor (1897); the first Japanese composer of Western-style sonatas
Kōsaku Yamada	1886	1965	Symphonic poem "Flower of Mandala" (1913), Sinfonia "Inno Meiji" (1921), Nagauta Symphony (1934); composer of the first Japanese symphony (1912)
Shukichi Mitsukuri	1895	1971	Co-founder of the Shinkō Sakkyokuka Renmei (1930)
Kan'ichi Shimofusa	1898	1962	Influential theory teacher at the Tokyo Music School
Hidemaro Konoye	1898	1973	Conductor and composer; made the first complete recording of Mahler's Fourth Symphony (1930)
Yasuji Kiyose	1900	1981	To Ancient Times for orchestra (1937); teacher of Toru Takemitsu
Saburō Moroi	1903	1977	Symphony No. 2 (1938), Violin Concerto (1939), Piano Sonata No. 2 (1939)
Noboru Ito	1903	1993	Early Japanese exponent of jazz-influenced concert music
Kunihiko Hashimoto	1904	1949	Symphony No. 1 in D (1940), Symphony No. 2 in F (1947)
Kikuko Kanai	1906	1986	Symphony No. 1 (1940), said to be the first symphony by a Japanese woman; drew extensively on Okinawan folk music. Some sources give her birth year as 1911.
Tomojirō Ikenouchi	1906	1991	Studied with Henri Büsser in Paris; founding professor of composition at the Tokyo University of the Arts
Yoritsune Matsudaira	1907	2001	Theme and Variations for Piano and Orchestra (1951), U-mai (1957), Sa-mai (1958)
Isotaro Sugata	1907	1952	Orchestral works rediscovered and recorded from the 1990s
Hisato Ohzawa	1907	1953	Symphony No. 1 (1934), Piano Concerto No. 3 "Kamikaze" (1938)
Shirō Fukai	1907	1959	Quatre Mouvements Parodiques (1933/1936)
Kozaburo Hirai	1910	2002	Choral and vocal works drawing on Japanese traditional idioms
Kōmei Abe	1911	2006	String Quartet No. 7 (1950), Symphony No. 1 (1957)
Hisatada Otaka	1911	1951	Cello Concerto (1944), Flute Concerto (1948); the Otaka Prize is named after him
Kazuo Yamada	1912	1991	Conductor and composer
Saburō Takata	1913	2000	Choral cycle "Mizu no Inochi" (1964)
Akira Ifukube	1914	2006	Ballata Sinfonica (1943), Ritmica Ostinata for piano and orchestra (1961/1971); also the music for Godzilla (1954)
Fumio Hayasaka	1914	1955	Ancient Dances on the Left and on the Right (1941), Yukara (1955); film scores for Akira Kurosawa including Rashomon (1950)
Kiyoshige Koyama	1914	2009	Kobiki-Uta for orchestra (1957), Symphonic Suite "Nohmen" (1959)
Minao Shibata	1916	1996	Pioneer of serial and electronic music in Japan; also a musicologist and critic
Mareo Ishiketa	1916	1996	Sinfonia in fa diesis e do (1965)
Roh Ogura	1916	1990	Dance Suite (1953), Symphony in G (1968). Some sources give his birth year as 1915.
Hiroshi Oguri	1918	1982	Fantasy on Osaka Folk Tunes (1955); a staple of the Japanese wind band repertoire
Yoshirō Irino	1921	1980	Sinfonietta (1953); composed the first Japanese twelve-tone work (1951)
Kan Ishii	1921	2009	Sinfonia Ainu (1959); operas and ballets
Sadao Bekku	1922	2012	Symphony No. 1 (1961), Violin Concerto (1969), Viola Concerto (1971)
Ikuma Dan	1924	2001	Opera "Yūzuru" (1952); six symphonies
Yasushi Akutagawa	1925	1989	Trinita Sinfonica (1948), Triptyque for string orchestra (1953), opera "Orpheus in Hiroshima" (1960), Concerto Ostinato for cello and orchestra (1969)
Teizo Matsumura	1929	2007	Achime (1957), Symphony No. 1 (1965), two piano concertos (1973, 1978), opera "Silence" (1993)
Toshiro Mayuzumi	1929	1997	Bacchanale (1954), Nirvana Symphony (1958), Mandala Symphony (1960), Bugaku (1962), opera "The Golden Pavilion" (1976)
Akio Yashiro	1929	1976	Symphony (1958), Cello Concerto (1960), Piano Sonata (1961), Piano Concerto (1967)
Joji Yuasa	1929	2024	Projection for Seven Players (1955), Chronoplastic (1972), Scenes from Bashō; member of Jikken Kōbō
Michio Mamiya	1929	2024	Three Compositions for Chorus (1958–68); opera "Narukami" (1974)
Toru Takemitsu	1930	1996	Requiem for string orchestra (1957), The Dorian Horizon (1966), November Steps (1967), A Flock Descends into the Pentagonal Garden (1977); Japan's most internationally performed concert composer
Minoru Miki	1930	2011	Founder of the ensemble Pro Musica Nipponia; operas including "Jōruri" (1985)
Makoto Moroi	1930	2013	Piano Concerto No. 1 (1966), Concerto for shakuhachi and 17-string koto (1975)
Ryōhei Hirose	1930	2008	Cello Concerto "Triste" (1971), Shakuhachi Concerto (1976)
Toshiya Sukegawa	1930	2015	Owari no Nai Asa ("The Eternal Morning"); also a critic and editor-in-chief of the journal Ongaku no Sekai
Hifumi Shimoyama	1930	2023	Reflection for three string orchestras (1969, ISCM World Music Days); the Fūmon series
Hikaru Hayashi	1931	2012	Symphony in G (1953), Viola Concerto "Elegia" (1995); also film music for Kaneto Shindo
Sei Ikeno	1931	2004	Rapsodia Concertante for violin and orchestra (1983)
Yuzo Toyama	1931	2023	Rhapsody for Orchestra (1960), Violin Concerto No. 1 (1963)
Makoto Shinohara	1931	2024	Studied with Olivier Messiaen and at the Cologne electronic music studio; assistant to Karlheinz Stockhausen
Yoriaki Matsudaira	1931	2023	Serial and indeterminate music; son of Yoritsune Matsudaira
Toshi Ichiyanagi	1933	2022	Violin Concerto "Circulating Scenery" (1983), Symphony "Berlin Renshi" (1989); introduced John Cage's music to Japan
Akira Miyoshi	1933	2013	Trois mouvements symphoniques (1960), Piano Concerto (1961), Violin Concerto (1965), Requiem (1970), Litania pour Fuji (1988)
Shuko Mizuno	1934		Jazz Orchestra 75, Symphonic Metamorphosis (Kokyoteki Hen'yo), Dies irae (Ikari no Hi); known for combining jazz, improvisation and orchestral writing81)
Takekuni Hirayoshi	1936	1998	Choral and piano music
Maki Ishii	1936	2003	Sō-gū II for gagaku and orchestra (1971); son of Kan Ishii
Keiko Abe	1937		Marimba virtuoso and composer; central to the creation of the modern marimba repertoire
Kikuko Masumoto	1937		Composer and scholar of gagaku
Yoshihisa Taira	1937	2005	Worked mainly in France; the Hiérophonie series
Yūji Takahashi	1938		Pianist, composer and writer; premiered works by Iannis Xenakis
Takehisa Kosugi	1938	2018	Fluxus artist; music director of the Merce Cunningham Dance Company
Meiko Shiomi	1938		Fluxus artist; the "Spatial Poem" event series
Shigeaki Saegusa	1942		Radiation Missa (1981), opera "Chūshingura" (1997)
Shin-ichiro Ikebe	1943		Symphony No. 2 "Trias" (1979), Symphony No. 3 "Ego Phano" (1984); film scores for Akira Kurosawa and Shohei Imamura
Atsutada Otaka	1944	2021	Image for orchestra (1981), Fantasy for organ and orchestra (1999); son of Hisatada Otaka
Jo Kondo	1947		Sen no Ongaku ("linear music"); theorist and teacher
Somei Satoh	1947		Litania (1973); works built on resonance and slow harmonic motion
Michio Kitazume	1948		Side by Side (1989); orchestral and percussion works
Akira Nishimura	1953	2023	Kecak for percussion ensemble (1979), Heterophony for two pianos and orchestra (1987), Canticle of Light (1996)
Takashi Yoshimatsu	1953		Threnody to Toki (1980), The Age of Birds (1986), Pleiades Dances (1986–2001)
Toshio Hosokawa	1955		Operas Hanjo (2004) and Matsukaze (2010); Circulating Ocean (2005)
Mamoru Fujieda	1955		The Patterns of Plants series
Masamichi Amano	1957		Orchestral works and film scores
Karen Tanaka	1961		Techno Etudes (2000); works often on ecological themes
Hikari Ōe	1963		Composer with a developmental disability; son of the novelist Kenzaburō Ōe
Keiko Fujiie	1963		Concertos and vocal works
Jun Nagao	1964		Wind band and orchestral works
Hiroyuki Yamamoto	1967		
Motoharu Kawashima	1972		Works using theatrical and gestural performance
Dai Fujikura	1977		Opera Solaris (2015); works for the Ensemble Intercontemporain and others

== Film, television and anime ==
- Chumei Watanabe (1925–2022) – Mazinger Z, Kikaider, the Super Sentai series
- Masaru Sato (1928–1999) – film scores for Akira Kurosawa and Ishirō Honda
- Shunsuke Kikuchi (1931–2021) – Dragon Ball, Doraemon
- Kunio Miyauchi (1932–2006) – Ultra Q, Ultraman, The Human Vapor
- Takeo Watanabe (1933–1989) – Mobile Suit Gundam
- Joe Hisaishi (born 1950) – scores for Hayao Miyazaki and Takeshi Kitano
- Shirō Sagisu (born 1957) – Neon Genesis Evangelion
- Yoichiro Yoshikawa (born 1957)
- Jun Miyake (born 1958)
- Akira Senju (born 1960)
- Michiru Oshima (born 1961) – film, television and video game scores
- Shinkichi Mitsumune (born 1963)
- Yoko Kanno (born 1963) – Cowboy Bebop, Ghost in the Shell: Stand Alone Complex
- Taro Iwashiro (born 1965) – Red Cliff
- Yuki Kajiura (born 1965) – Puella Magi Madoka Magica, Sword Art Online
- Hiroyuki Sawano (born 1980) – Attack on Titan

== Video game music ==
- Koichi Sugiyama (1931–2021) – Dragon Quest
- Nobuo Uematsu (born 1959) – Final Fantasy
- Koji Kondo (born 1961) – Super Mario Bros., The Legend of Zelda
- Michiru Yamane (born 1963) – Castlevania
- Yoko Shimomura (born 1967) – Street Fighter II, Kingdom Hearts
- Yasunori Mitsuda (born 1972) – Chrono Trigger

== Popular and other music ==
- Koga Masao (1904–1978) – originator of the kayōkyoku style known as the "Koga melody"
- Isao Tomita (1932–2016) – pioneer of synthesizer music; Snowflakes Are Dancing (1974)
- Ryuichi Sakamoto (1952–2023) – Yellow Magic Orchestra; Academy Award-winning score for The Last Emperor (1987)
- Yoko Noge (born 1957) – blues and jazz composer and bandleader
- Yoshiki (born 1965) – X Japan; "Anniversary", written for the tenth anniversary of the reign of Emperor Akihito (1999); theme for the Golden Globe Awards

== See also ==
- Music of Japan
- Japan Composer's Association
- Japan Federation of Composers
- Shinkō Sakkyokuka Renmei
- List of composers by nationality
