= Elgar Symphony No. 1 discography =

The first recording of Edward Elgar's Symphony No 1 was made by the London Symphony Orchestra in 1930, conducted by the composer for His Master's Voice (a label absorbed into the EMI recording group the following year). The recording was reissued on long-playing record (LP) in 1970, and on compact disc in 1992 as part of EMI's "Elgar Edition" of all the composer's electrical recordings of his works.

After 1931, the work had no further gramophone recordings until Sir Adrian Boult's 1950 recording (see below). During the 1950s there was only one other new recording of the symphony, and in the 1960s there were only two. In the 1970s there were four new recordings. In the 1980s there were six, and the 1990s saw twelve. Ten new recordings were released in the first decade of the 21st century.

== Recordings by date ==
Conductor	Orchestra	Label	Recording date	Release date
The composer	London Symphony Orchestra	EMI	20–22 November 1930	1931
Sir Adrian Boult	London Philharmonic Orchestra	EMI	1949	1950
Sir John Barbirolli	Hallé Orchestra	Pye	1954	1957
Sir John Barbirolli	Hallé Orchestra	Barbirolli Society	30 January 1958 (live)	
Sir John Barbirolli	Philharmonia Orchestra	EMI	1962	1963
Sir Adrian Boult	London Philharmonic Orchestra	Lyrita	January 1968	1968
Constantin Silvestri	Bournemouth Symphony Orchestra	BBC Legends	25 July 1968 (live)	2006
Sir John Barbirolli	Hallé Orchestra	BBC Legends	1970 (live)	2002
Sir Georg Solti	London Philharmonic Orchestra	Decca	February 1972	1972
Daniel Barenboim	London Philharmonic Orchestra	CBS	1974	1974
Sir Alexander Gibson	Scottish National Orchestra	RCA	1976 (?)	1976
Sir Adrian Boult	BBC Symphony Orchestra	BBC Radio Classics	1976 (live)	1995
Sir Adrian Boult	London Philharmonic Orchestra	EMI	September 1976	1977
Vernon Handley	London Philharmonic Orchestra	EMI	1979	1980
James Loughran	Hallé Orchestra	ASV		1981
Bernard Haitink	Philharmonia Orchestra	EMI	1983	1983
Sir John Pritchard	BBC Symphony Orchestra	BBC Radio Classics	1983 (live)	1996
Vernon Handley	London Philharmonic Orchestra	LPO	23 February 1984 (live)	2010
André Previn	Royal Philharmonic Orchestra	Philips	1985	1986
Sir Colin Davis	BBC Symphony Orchestra	RCA	13 May 1985 (live)	1996
Bryden Thomson	London Philharmonic Orchestra	Chandos	October 1985	1986
Yehudi Menuhin	Royal Philharmonic Orchestra	Virgin		1989
Sir Charles Mackerras	London Symphony Orchestra	Decca	April 1990	1991
Leonard Slatkin	London Philharmonic Orchestra	RCA	1990	1991
Sir Neville Marriner	Academy of St Martin in the Fields	Collins		1991
David Zinman	Baltimore Symphony Orchestra	Telarc	January 1991	1992
James Judd	Hallé Orchestra	Pickwick		1991
Sir Andrew Davis	BBC Symphony Orchestra	Teldec	1991	1991
Giuseppe Sinopoli	Philharmonia Orchestra	DG	1991	1992
Jeffrey Tate	London Symphony Orchestra	EMI	1991	1992
Tadaaki Otaka	NHK Symphony Orchestra	King International	20 November 1991 (live)	2017
George Hurst	BBC Philharmonic	Naxos	April 1992	1993
Julian Clayton	Chetham's Symphony Orchestra	Olympia		1995
William Boughton	English Symphony Orchestra	Nimbus	June 1995	1995
Tadaaki Otaka	BBC National Orchestra of Wales	BIS	1995	1996
Stephen Somary	Thüringen Philharmonie (Suhl)	Claves	1996	1996
Bramwell Tovey	National Youth Orchestra of Scotland	NYOS	August 1997	1998
Sir Colin Davis	Dresden Staatskapelle	Hänssler Profil	1998	2006
Sir Colin Davis	London Symphony Orchestra	LSO Live	2001 (live)	2002
Sir Mark Elder	Hallé Orchestra	Hallé	July 2002	2003
Sir Roger Norrington	Stuttgart Radio Symphony Orchestra	Hänssler	27–29 October 1999 (live)	2000
Jeffrey Tate	Melbourne Symphony Orchestra	ABC	24–25 June 2005 (live)	2006
Richard Hickox	BBC National Orchestra of Wales	Chandos	May 2006	2006
Martyn Brabbins	Flemish Radio Orchestra	Glossa	September 2006	2007
Sir Andrew Davis	Philharmonia Orchestra	Decca	4 March 2007 (live)	2010
Sir Andrew Davis	Philharmonia Orchestra	Signum	12 April 2007 (live)	2010
Vladimir Ashkenazy	Sydney Symphony Orchestra	Exton	2008	2009
Edo de Waart	Milwaukee Symphony Orchestra	MSO Classics	2014	2014
Vasily Petrenko	Royal Liverpool Philharmonic	Onyx	2010	2015
Tadaaki Otaka	Sapporo Symphony Orchestra	Fontec	8-11 November 2012 (live)	2013
Hilary Davan Wetton	National Children's Orchestra of Great Britain		2015	
Daniel Barenboim	Staatskapelle Berlin	Decca	19 & 21 September 2015	2016
Sir Antonio Pappano	Orchestra dell'Accademia Nazionale di Santa Cecilia	ICA Classics	2012 (live)	2016
Edward Gardner	BBC Symphony Orchestra	Chandos	2016	2017
Joseph Wolfe	Hyogo Performing Arts Center Orchestra	Livenotes	21-22 April 2017 (live)	2017
Sir Mark Elder	Hallé	Hallé	2018	2024
Tadaaki Otaka	Osaka Philharmonic Orchestra	Exton	17-18 & 22 January 2019 (live)	2019

== Critical opinion ==
BBC Radio 3's "Building a Library" feature, a comparative review of all available recordings, has considered the symphony three times since 1982, recommending as follows:

- 23 January 1982, reviewer, Andrew Keener:
  - London Philharmonic Orchestra, Sir Adrian Boult (1977)
  - London Philharmonic Orchestra, Vernon Handley
- 23 April 1994, reviewer, Jerrold Northrop Moore:
  - BBC Philharmonic, George Hurst
  - London Symphony Orchestra, Sir Edward Elgar
- 17 March 2007, reviewer, David Owen Norris:
  - Dresden Staatskapelle, Sir Colin Davis

The Penguin Guide to Recorded Classical Music, 2008 edition, awarded its maximum four star rating ("a really exceptional issue on every count") to Solti's LPO set (coupled with the Second Symphony) and Barbirolli's final 1970 recording (coupled with the Introduction and Allegro). The Guide's three star rating ("an outstanding performance and recording") was given to both of the EMI recordings by Boult, and to Colin Davis (LSO Live), Hurst, Elder, and Handley.
