= Otaka =

Otaka, Ōtaka or Ootaka (written: 大高, 大鷹 or おおたか in hiragana) is a Japanese surname. Notable people with the surname include:

- Akira Otaka (大鷹 明良, born 1957), Japanese actor
- Rikiya Otaka (大高 力也, born 1991), Japanese actor
- Yoshiko Ōtaka (大鷹 淑子, 1920–2014), Japanese actress, singer and politician
- Yukiko Otaka (大高 幸子, born 1940), Japanese swimmer

Otaka (written: 尾高 or おたか in hiragana) is a separate Japanese surname. Notable people with the surname include:

- Atsutada Otaka (尾高 惇忠, 1944–2021), Japanese composer and musicologist
- Hisatada Otaka (尾高 尚忠, 1911–1951), Japanese composer and conductor
- Tadaaki Otaka (尾高 忠明, born 1947), Japanese music conductor
