= Kikuko =

- Gender: female

Origin
- Origin: Japanese
- Meaning: different meanings depending on the kanji used

Kikuko (written: 喜久子, 伎共子 or 記久子) is a feminine Japanese given name. Notable people with the name include:

- Kikuko Inoue (井上 喜久子; born 1964), Japanese singer and voice actress
- Kikuko Inoue (井上 喜久子; 1924–2018), Japanese equestrian
- Kikuko Kanai (金井 喜久子; 1911–1986), Japanese composer
- Kikuko Kawakami (川上 喜久子; 1904–1985), Japanese writer
- Kikuko Masumoto (増本 伎共子; born 1937), Japanese pianist, music educator and classical composer
- Kikuko Mikawa (参河 紀久子; born 1968), Japanese basketball player
- Kikuko Okajima (岡島 喜久子; born 1958), Japanese businesswoman and former footballer
- Kikuko Tokugawa (徳川 喜久子; 1911–2004), later Princess Takamatsu of Japan
- Kikuko Tsumura (津村 記久子; born 1978), Japanese writer
