= Danmono =

Traditional Japanese style of instrumental music for the koto

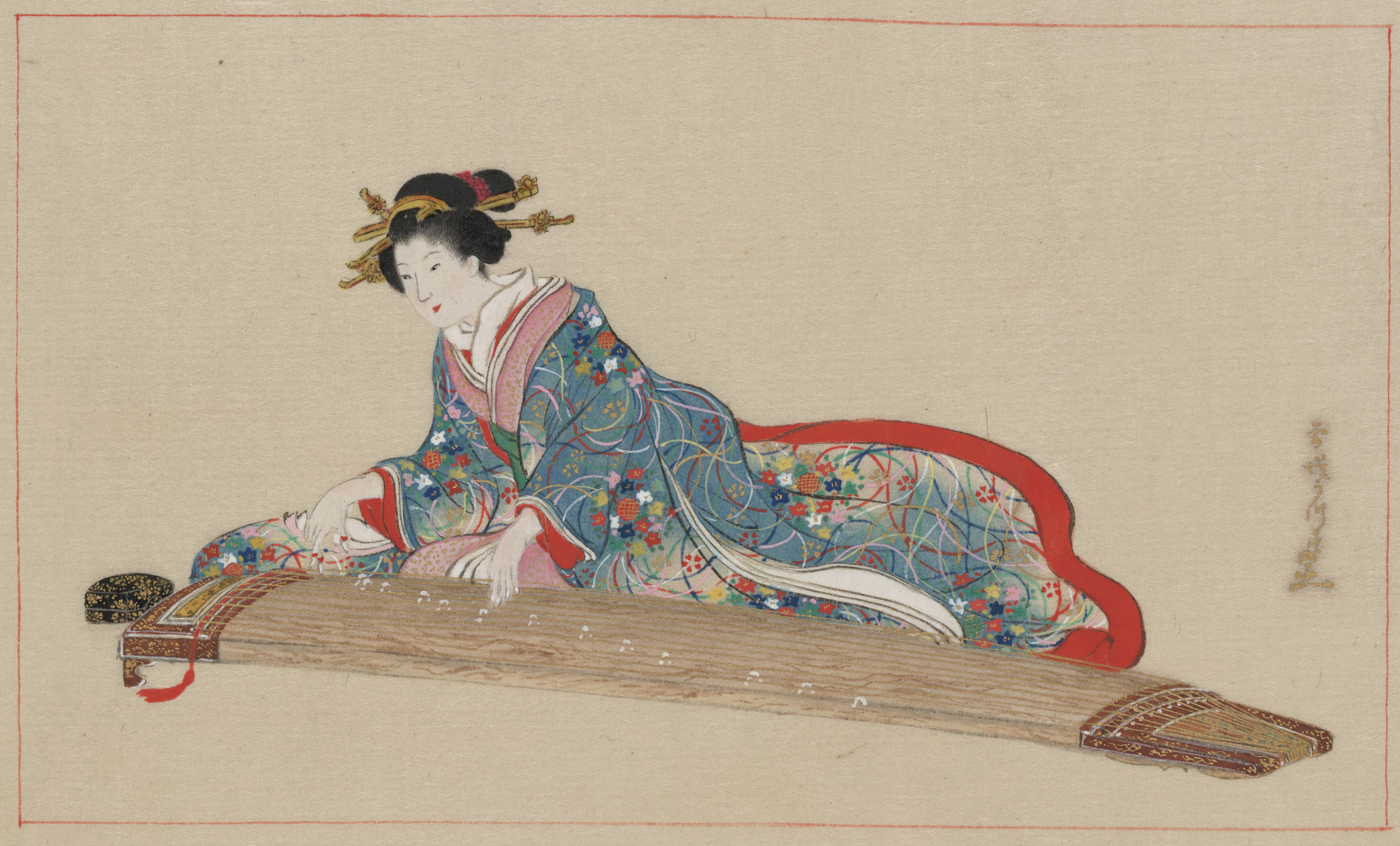
A woman playing a koto, depicted in 1878 by Settei Hasegawa.

Danmono (Japanese: 段物) is a traditional Japanese style of instrumental music for the koto. The few pieces of its repertoire were mostly composed and developed in the seventeenth century, and all follow a strict form of composition.

== Musical style ==
Each danmono piece consists of a number of movements, or variations ("dan" in Japanese means "step"). Each dan consists of 104 beats, except for the first. The first dan is preceded by a four or eight-beat introduction, called kandō. The few pieces that make up the danmono repertoire are all very similar in musical style. Listeners unfamiliar with the danmono style have trouble distinguishing one piece from another. The reason for the strong similarities between the danmono pieces is that originality was unusual for seventeenth- and eighteenth-century Japanese composers. Each danmono piece begins slowly, and gradually increases in tempo. At the very end of the piece the tempo decreases, and it ends slowly.

== Repertoire ==
The danmono repertoire consists of eight pieces, developed primarily during the seventeenth century. The titles of the pieces denote the number of dan they consist of: "Godan" ("five dan"), "Rokudan" ("six dan"), "Shichidan" ("seven dan"), "Hachidan" ("eight dan"), "Kudan" ("nine dan"), and "Kumoi Kudan" ("nine dan in hon-kumoijoshi"). Another piece, "Midare", is traditionally classified as danmono, but does not follow the same strict form of musical composition as the others. "Midare" is also referred to as "Judan" ("ten dan") in the Ikuta ryu school, or "Junidan" ("twelve dan") in the Yamada ryu school. The introduction of "Aki kaze no kyoku" by Mitsuzaki Kengyo was composed in the danmono form, and is also considered to be part of its repertoire. Aside from this last piece, the authorship of the danmono repertoire is disputed among historical sources. The table below shows the possible composers according to various sources.

Source abbreviations

- ST: Sokyoku taiisho (1779)
- BGT: Buso gafu taiseishu (1812)
- KK: Koto no kumiuta (1822)
- KZ: Kumiuta zenshu (1941)

Composition	Composer according to ST, BGT, and KZ	Composer according to KK
Rokudan	Yatsuhashi	Kitajima
Midare	Yatsuhashi	Kurahashi
Hachidan	Yatsuhashi	Kurahashi
Kudan	unknown	Kitajima
Shichidan	unknown	Yasumura
Godan	Kitajima or Ikuta	Tomino Koto
Kumoi Kudan	Mitsuhashi	Mitsuhashi

Although not considered part of the danmono repertoire, a forerunner of the danmono style was "Sugagaki", published by Nakamura Sōzan in Shichiku Shoshinshū in 1664. The publication was aimed at the general population rather than professional musicians.
