= Nobutoki =

- Gender: Male

Origin
- Origin: Japanese
- Meaning: Different meanings depending on the kanji used

Nobutoki (written: 信時 or 信祝) is a masculine Japanese given name. Notable people with the name include:

- Matsudaira Nobutoki (松平 信祝) (1683–1744), Japanese daimyō
- Oda Nobutoki (織田 信時) (died June 1556), Japanese daimyō

Nobutoki (written: 信時) is also a Japanese surname. Notable people with the surname include:

- Kiyoshi Nobutoki (信時 潔) (1887–1965), Japanese composer and cellist
