= Next Mushroom Promotion =

Japanese classical music ensemble

- Genres: Contemporary classical
- Years active: 2001-present
- Members: Tomoko Fukaui; Motoharo Kawashima; Nozomi Ueda
- Website: kinoko2001.music.coocan.jp

Next Mushroom Promotion is a contemporary classical music ensemble founded by composer Tomoko Fukaui in 2001. The purpose of the group is to promote and revitalize contemporary classical /chamber music outside of the Tokyo metropolitan area. Along with founding members composer Motoharu Kawashima and clarinetist Nozomi Ueda, Next Mushroom Promotion mainly performs and work with musicians in the Kansai region of Japan (Kyoto, Osaka, Hyogo). In 2014, the group was invited to represent Japan at the Festival Internacional Cervantino in Mexico.

The group also works to promote new works by Japanese composers. Their repertoire includes pieces such as EDI, for the clarinet by Toshio Hosokawa, Vertical time study for clarinet, chello and piano by Hosokawa, Schlaglicht for the violin and piano by Tomoko Fukui, Sonanitino for piano by Conlon Nancarrow and Yuunohui'tlapoa'ome for viola by Julio Estrada.

Their name is a reference and homage to John Cage's work. Cage was an important musical philosopher and promoter as well as an expert in mushrooms.

== See also ==
Port.hu
