= La Vía Láctea =

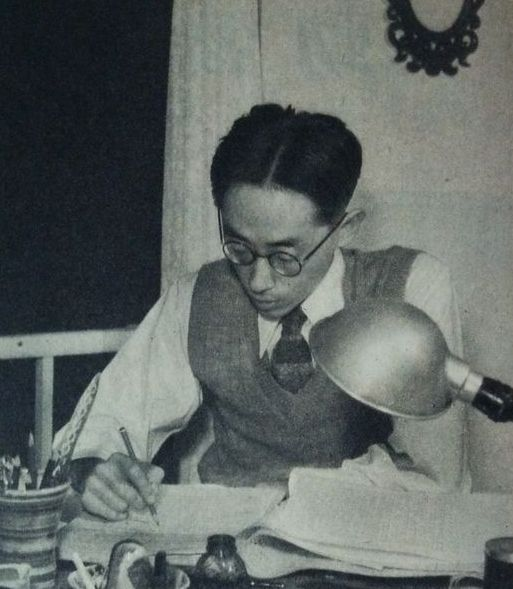
Minao Shibata in 1952

La Vía Láctea (Japanese: 銀河街道, Hepburn: Ginga kaidō) is a music theatre piece for children's choir composed by a Japanese composer Minao Shibata (b. 1916 - d. 1996) in 1993. The piece is about the way of St. James and uses medieval Christian hymns and folk songs as material. It lasts approximately one hour.

== Backgournd ==
The composer Namio Shibata, who died in 1996, spent his last about 20 years of his approximately 60 years of creative activity, from around 1973, creating works in a format known as "music theatre pieces." Generally to say, "music theatre" comes in many forms, but Shibata's works are characterized by its use of the medium of chorus and traditional Japanese materials. During the last 20 years of his life, he composed over 20 pieces in music theatre form, almost all of which were inspired by local folk and traditional performing arts in Japan. On the other hand, La Vía Láctea is the only exception among them, in that he chose subject matter from the traditional culture of a foreign country.

However, both his previous music theatre works and La Vía Láctea share the commonality of using local folk songs and performing arts as material, and it could be said that the only difference is that the region of the work has been shifted from Japan to a foreign country. This work can also be considered an example of a work that applies the concept of a series of his music theatre works that focus on Japan's "regional character" to a region overseas.

Shibata himself was not a Catholic though, during his university years, he attended church mass every Sunday (Note: Shibata attended the Tokyo St. Francis Xavier major seminary, formerly located in Shakujii Village, every Sunday.) and listened to Gregorian chant. Thereafter he never lost interest in Christianity for the rest of his life. La Vía Láctea was commissioned by Nissay Theatre for a children's choir, and has an educational purpose: the purpose is to learn, through singing, acting and listening, what the simple and pure faith of medieval Christianity was like.

The libretto is an excerpt from the Codex Calixtinus, a 12th-century manuscript about the pilgrimage to Santiago de Compostela, translated from the original Latin text into Japanese by the composer's wife, Sumiko Shibata. Therefore, the lyrics, excluding the entrance song and the exit song (both has Latin lylics), are written in Japanese. The work was completed in 1993 and premiered the same year. The composer gave La Vía Láctea his opus number 113.

== Description ==
The work is written for a children's choir and a female choir (ad libitum) and is unaccompanied. It lasts approximately one hour totally and consists of the following five parts:

1. Entrance song - Iacobe Sancte
2. Route of Iacobe Sancte
3. Journey of pilgrimage
4. Gate of groly, Canon of the sunset (ad libitum) and Canon of the Finale
5. Exit song - Iacobe Sancte

Performers enter the concert hall with singing an entrance song and exit with singing an exit song. The second part is a song that explains the pilgrimage route. The song tells the historical story of how Santiago de Compostela became a sacred place dedicated to Sanctus Iacobus (James the Great), and how the road leading to it became a pilgrimage route. The third part is the heart of the piece, with a medieval pilgrim song, local folk songs, a children's play song and a skit performed by children.

In the first half of his creative career, Shibata was known for incorporating many avant-garde techniques, but in the second half he brought these together and showed a new direction by mixing and synthesizing music from the past. In La Vía Láctea, folk songs and ancient melodies are used, and children also perform a skit. It showcases Shibata's creative technique of reconstructing a variety of materials.

According to Sumiko Shibata, the medieval folk songs used in La Vía Láctea are all monophonic, and when each child begins to sing one of these monophonic melodies separately, a beautiful harmony emerges by chance.(cf. Aleatoric music)

== History of performance ==
La Vía Láctea premiered in 1993 and has since been performed several times, including in 2000, 2007, 2008 and 2017.
