= Hiroyuki Yamamoto (composer) =

Japanese composer

Hiroyuki Yamamoto 山本 裕之
- Born: 7 March 1967 (age 59); Yamagata Prefecture, Japan
- Occupation: Contemporary composer
- Years active: 1990–present

Hiroyuki Yamamoto (山本 裕之, Yamamoto Hiroyuki; born 7 March 1967 in Yamagata Prefecture) is a contemporary Japanese composer.

== Biography ==
Hiroyuki Yamamoto was born in Yamagata Prefecture and grew up in Zushi, Kanagawa. He studied at the Tokyo University of the Arts and graduated in 1990. He studied composition with Akira Kitamura, Jo Kondo, and Isao Matsushita. After graduating, he took a position at Iwate University in Morioka, Iwate.

Yamamoto was invited to participate in the Forum 91 in 1991 at the Université de Montréal in Montreal, Quebec, Canada. His work was also performed at the International Gaudeamus Music Week in 1994. After he won the third prize of the Competition BMW Musica Viva in 1998, his selected work Canticum Tremulum I was premiered with the Bavarian Radio Symphony Orchestra of Munich in 2000.

Yamamoto directed the Ensemble d'Ame in Tokyo from 1997–2000. Along with Haruyuki Suzuki, Yoshifumi Tanaka, Hiroshi Yokoshima and other Japanese composers, Yamamoto was a founding member of the composer's group "Tempus Novum" in 1990.

== Awards ==
- Third prize, The 58th Japan Music Competition in 1989 with the work Closed Figure
- League of Practica Musica award in 1991
- Prize, 13th competition of the Japanese Group for Contemporary Music in 1996 for the piano work Forma.
- Third prize, BMW Musica Viva Competition in 1998 for Canticum Tremulum I
- First prize, Toru Takemitsu Composition Award in 2002 for Canticum Tremulum II
- The 13th Akutagawa Composition Prize in 2003

== Selected works ==
As a composer, Yamamoto has written for all genres, including works for orchestra, band, chorus, vocal music and opera.

Opera

- Imaginative Landscape (無伴奏モノ・オペラ《想像風景》), Unaccompanied Mono-Opera for female voice with mobile-phone and flexatone (2000)

Orchestral

- Interlude (間奏曲) for string orchestra (1990)
- Canticum Tremulum I (カンティクム・トレムルム I) (1998)
- Trumpet Lilies (トランペット・リリース) for solo trumpet and band (2000)
- Canticum Tremulum II (カンティクム・トレムルム II) (2001)
- Tabulata (層) (2003)
- The Monody Community (モノディ協同体) (2005)
- Excellent Inverted V (見事な逆V字) for wind orchestra (2006)
- バビロンの流れを変えよ for wind orchestra (2007)
- インケルタエ・セディス for string orchestra (2010)

Choral

- Takashi for mixed chorus and piano (2004); words by Tomohisa Matsuura
- The Champa Flower (チャムパの花) for double mixed chorus and piano (2004); words by Rabindranath Tagore
- Rouroutei no Uta (労労亭の歌) for vocal ensemble and piano (2004); words by Libai = Tomohisa Matsuura
- Kenji-Sai (賢治祭) for vocal ensemble (2004); words by Machi Tawara
- Sonor Aquae (水の音) for vocal ensemble (2006); words by Matsuo Bashō

Vocal

- Sonitus Ambiguus II (ソニトゥス・アンビグースII) for female voice, saxophone and piano (1996)
- Umi-no Mieru Fukei (海の見える風景) for mezzo-soprano and piano (2005); words by Yukari Kojima

Chamber music

- Closed Figure (閉ざされた形) for viola, violoncello, flute, clarinet, harp and percussion (1988–1989)
- Klanglinie (響きの輪郭) for violin, cello, flute, clarinet, piano and percussion (1989)
- Sonitus Ambiguus I (ソニトゥス・アンビグースI) for string quartet (1995)
- Continental Shelf (大陸棚) for solo tuba (1996)
- Integumentum (インテグメントゥム) for soprano saxophone and cowbells (1996)
- Concertino per trombe con sordini (弱音器群を伴うトランペット合奏のための小協奏曲) for solo trumpet, 3 trumpets, 2 cornets (1997)
- Eve I for string quartet (1997)
- Tropic of Cancer (北回帰線) for violin, viola, bass, alto flute, bassoon, trumpet and percussion (1997)
- Articulation Introverted (内向的なアーティキュレーション) for cello, trumpet and percussion (1998)
- Introduzione, Andante, Finale e Scherzo (序奏、アンダンテ、スケルツォと終曲) for cello, flute, clarinet and piano (1998)
- Relay Trio (中継のトリオ) for violin, viola and flute (1999)
- Rite Praet, Praesens, Futurus (昨日、今日、明日) for flauto traverso and flute (1999)
- Noli me tangere (私に触れてはいけません) for solo alto saxophone, violin, viola, cello, bass, flute, clarinet, trumpet, trombone and percussion (2000)
- Inclino (私は傾斜する) for alto saxophone, violin, musical saw and piano (2000)
- Relay Duo (中継のデュオ) for violin and percussion (2000)
- Theme and 23 Variations (主題と23の変奏) for violin and piano (2000)
- Ultro citroque (彼方と此方) for violin, cello and piano (2001)
- Boundaries on Africa (アフリカの境界) for trumpet, guitar and piano (2001)
- Liber vermiculatus (蝕べかけの本) for zephyros and piano (2001)
- Matsumorphosis (まつもるふぉしす) for solo violin (2001)
- Textile Texts (テクスタイル・テクスツ) for clarinet and viola (2001)
- Eve II for violin and cello (2001)
- Le Dieu de Samuel (サミュエルの神) for flute, percussion, nohkan and Japanese drums (2002)
- Fareflat (フェアフラット) for accordion, saxophone and bass (2002–2005)
- Japan Sea Monody (日本海モノディ) for violin and trumpet (2004)
- What Bridget Saw (ブリジットの見たもの) for alto saxophone, oboe, clarinet, bass clarinet and bassoon (2005)
- Strait (海峡) for violin, cello, flute and piano (2005)
- Fault Zone (断層帯) for violin, cello, flute, oboe, trombone, vibraphone and percussion (2005)
- Conveying Chorale (伝達コラール) for 8 trombones (2006)
- The Wedge Is Struck, the Fog Remains (楔を打てど、霧は晴れず) for clarinet and piano (2006)

Piano

- Tokyo Concerto (東京コンチェルト) (1993)
- Forma (フォールマ) (1996); won the prize at the 13th contest of the Japanese Society for Contemporary Music (ISCM Japanese section)
- Pars lunae (月の役割) (1999)
- Salta Trix e Terpsichore (テレプシコーレ舞踏者) (2000)
- Origo pedum I (足の起源I) (2002)
- Origo pedum II (足の起源II) (2004)
- Musique pour Haus Kasuya (ハウス・カスヤのための音楽) (2005)
- Tokyo Dance (東京舞曲) (2010)

Percussion

- Peninsula (半島) (2003)

Japanese traditional instruments

- Cassini Division (カッシーニ間隙) for gagaku ensemble (2005)
