= Introduction and Allegro (Elgar) =

1905 musical work by Edward Elgar

Elgar in 1903

Edward Elgar's Introduction and Allegro for Strings, Op. 47, was composed in 1905 for performance in an all-Elgar concert by the newly formed London Symphony Orchestra. It is a string concertante piece scored for string quartet and string orchestra, Elgar wrote it to show off the players' virtuosity. For its structure he drew on the 18th-century concerto grosso form.

The work was an immediate success in Britain, where it has remained a favourite in concert and on record. Orchestras outside Britain programme the piece rarely, although it has been recorded by orchestras from the US, Germany, Slovakia, Austria and the Netherlands, and conducted for records by, among others, Arturo Toscanini, Charles Munch, Bernard Haitink, Tadaaki Otaka, Pinchas Zukerman and Semyon Bychkov.

== Background ==
The Introduction and Allegro was written in response to a request from the composer's publisher and close friend August Jaeger for a work to showcase the virtuoso playing of the newly formed London Symphony Orchestra (LSO). In a letter dated 28 October 1904, Jaeger recalled an outstanding performance of Bach's Brandenburg Concerto No 3 for string orchestra that he and Elgar had heard, conducted by Fritz Steinbach at the Lower Rhenish Music Festival in May:

I'll hope you can write the [London] Symphony orchestra a short new work. Why not a brilliant quick String Scherzo, or something for those fine strings only? a real bring down the House torrent of a thing such as Bach could write (remember that Cologne Brandenburger Concerto!) a five minutes work would do it! It wouldn't take you away from your big work for long. You might even write a modern Fugue for Strings, or Strings & Organ! That would sell like Cakes.

Elgar accepted the challenge, and wrote to Jaeger in January 1905: "I'm doing that string thing in time for the Sym: orch: concert. Intro: & Allegro – no working out part but a devil of a fugue instead. G major & the sd. divvel in G minor". He later wrote of the piece:

Some three years ago in Cardiganshire I thought of writing a brilliant piece for string orchestra. On the cliff, between blue sea and blue sky, thinking out my theme, there came up to me the sound of singing. The songs were too far away to reach me distinctly, but one point common to all was impressed upon me, and led me to think, perhaps wrongly, that it was a real Welsh idiom – I mean the fall of a third – Fitting the need of the moment, I made the tune which appears in the Introduction (as a link) and in the Coda of this work … The sketch was forgotten until a short time ago, when it was brought to mind by hearing, far down our valley of the Wye, a song similar to that so pleasantly heard on Ynys Lochtyn. The singer of the Wye unknowingly reminded me of my sketch. This I have now completed, and, although there may be (and I hope there is) a Welsh feeling in the one theme … the work is really a tribute to that sweet borderland where I have made my home.

== Premiere ==
Advertisement for the premiere, 1905

The premiere took place at the Queen's Hall, London, on 8 March 1905, conducted by the composer. The work was an immediate success. The Times said, "Never has the composer given us work of finer quality … When it is as familiar as the spirited Cockaigne and the beautiful Variations, there is little doubt that it will rank as high as they". The Manchester Guardian said, "The workmanship is very elaborate, and the scoring shows the highest kind of skill, the effects produced by the opposition and combination of the solo quartet and the orchestra being highly original and full of interest, while the whole is transfigured by a very beautiful touch of imagination". The Observer commented that the piece "has about it a degree of breadth, solidity and brilliance that stamps it at once as made for popularity". The Western Mail said that the work was "hailed with enthusiasm by the critics and public alike ... destined to rival in popularity any of the other efforts from his pen and at the same time appeals very strongly to the cultivated musician". After Walter Damrosch conducted the American premiere on 26 November 1905 the reviewer in The New York Times, calling the work "of more than ordinary interest and importance", focused on its modernisation of the 18th-century concerto grosso form, and judged the music "sound and substantial in its fibre, without great distinction in its thematic invention" but with "a quite remarkable richness and variety of color".

The work, dedicated to Samuel Sanford of Yale University, quickly entered the British concert repertoire. Sir Henry Wood programmed it twice during the 1905 Proms season, and it was given in more than half the Proms seasons over the next hundred years. The piece was less enthusiastically received in Manchester: the Elgar scholar Andrew Neil records that when it was first performed there, by the Hallé Orchestra, on 7 December 1905, "Hans Richter, in his first concert with the orchestra, "seized on the tepid applause and conducted the work again, much to the surprise of the audience and, no doubt, the Hallé players". The work is much less frequently played in concerts outside Britain, although in Italy, Arturo Toscanini toured it along with the Enigma Variations. The BBC broadcast the work for the first time in 1928.

== Structure ==
Introduction and Allegro for Strings
Performed in 2020 by the New York Classical Players

Introduction and Allegro for Strings
Performed in 2018 by the United States Marine Band

The piece opens with a tutti descending fanfare, which segues into a major-key moderato section, interspersed by an Allegretto e poco stringendo section two bars in length. A slow, lyrical theme is played by the solo viola and then Elgar switches between soloist and orchestra by use of echo. A romantic section leads into a recapitulation of the opening fanfare and Welsh theme, ending the Introduction and moving into the Allegro.

The Allegro begins with a theme in G major built around a crotchet – quaver – quaver motif. 21 bars of non-stop semiquavers build from piano to a powerful forte as the piece arrives at a hemiola-infused G major restatement of the Introduction's opening fanfare. Instead of a development section as would be expected in traditional sonata form, a new theme is introduced, a vigorous fugue in which the piece returns to the opening key of G minor. After the fugue concludes, the piece's themes are all recapitulated in G major, initially begun by a unison orchestra before dividing across echo between orchestra and solo quartet. The Welsh theme is repeated, ending in a triple forte, on which the orchestra is in unison again. It is this time echoed by the solo quartet, by contrast with the rest of the piece. The Welsh theme appears in a coda for the fifth and final time, before ending with a ternary perfect cadence followed by a G major chord in which the whole orchestra plays pizzicato, except for the double basses, who play with their bows.

== Difficulty ==
Opinions have varied about the difficulty the work presents to the players. The conductor Sir Andrew Davis observed, "As a violinist himself [Elgar] knew how to write both what sounded impressive but lay comfortably under the fingers and also what would truly test the mettle of the players and push them to their limits. As any performer of the piece knows, he chose the latter course. In all the string orchestra repertoire it is, in my opinion, by far the most demanding". The conductor Sir Mark Elder takes a similar view: "The biggest challenge is its difficulty. No matter how many times you play it you still have to focus on it, for it does not come easily". By contrast, Claire Parfitt, a member of the LSO's violin section, has said, "Many say it is incredibly difficult, but it isn't – provided you are a reasonably proficient player – a good amateur orchestra will cope more than satisfactorily". The violist Chris Yates has said "In the Introduction and Allegro the parts are challenging but they are so well written that a player fresh to the work will soon work out how they are going to play their part and obtain great satisfaction thereby". An earlier violist, Bernard Shore, who considered the piece "a masterpiece for strings, still unchallenged by any other work in this field for its mastery of string writing", commented that "40 or 50 virtuosi here have to play as one and only magnificent leadership and training can bring this off to perfection. Played for safety, the whole of this opening becomes flat and stodgy".

== Recordings ==
Although he conducted recordings of most of his other major orchestral works, and many of the minor ones, Elgar never recorded the Introduction and Allegro. After hearing John Barbirolli's 1929 recording, the composer commented, "I'd never realised it was such a big work". He was content with Barbirolli's recording, commenting, "Mr Barbirolli is an extremely able youth and, very properly, has ideas of his own".

The orchestra that premiered the work in the concert hall – the LSO – did not record it until a hundred years had passed.

Orchestra	Conductor	Year
Chamber Orchestra	John Barbirolli	1927
Chamber Orchestra	John Barbirolli	1929
BBC Symphony Orchestra	Sir Adrian Boult	1937
NBC Symphony Orchestra	Arturo Toscanini	1940
Hallé Orchestra	John Barbirolli	1947
New Symphony Orchestra	Anthony Collins	1952
London Philharmonic Orchestra	Sir Adrian Boult	1954
Hallé Orchestra	Sir John Barbirolli	1956
Boston Symphony Orchestra	Charles Munch	1957
New York Philharmonic	Sir John Barbirolli	1959
Sinfonia of London	Sir John Barbirolli	1963
English Chamber Orchestra	Benjamin Britten	1969
Hallé Orchestra	Sir John Barbirolli	1970
London Philharmonic Orchestra	Sir Adrian Boult	1973
Orchestra of St John's, Smith Square	John Lubbock	1975
Staatskapelle Dresden	Neville Marriner	1982
London Philharmonic Orchestra	Vernon Handley	1983
London Philharmonic Orchestra	Bernard Haitink	1984
Polish Chamber Orchestra	Volker Schmidt‑Gertenbach	1987
London Chamber Orchestra	Christopher Warren-Green	1988
Capella Istropolitana	Adrian Leaper	1989
BBC Symphony Orchestra	Andrew Davis	1991
English Symphony Orchestra	William Boughton	1994
BBC Welsh Symphony Orchestra	Tadaaki Otaka	1995
London Festival Orchestra	Ross Pople	1997
Vienna Philharmonic	Sir John Elliot Gardiner	2002
Hallé Orchestra	Sir Mark Elder	2004
London Symphony Orchestra	Sir Colin Davis	2005
Royal Philharmonic Orchestra	Barry Wordsworth	2009
London Philharmonic Orchestra	Paul Daniel	2010
BBC Philharmonic Orchestra	Sir Andrew Davis	2012
Orchestra of the Swan	David Curtis	2014
English Chamber Orchestra	Julian Lloyd Webber	2015
London Symphony Orchestra	Roman Simovic	2016
Royal Philharmonic Orchestra	Pinchas Zukerman	2016
BBC Symphony Orchestra	Edward Gardner	2017
Berlin Philharmonic Orchestra	Semyon Bychkov	2018
Stuttgart Radio Symphony Orchestra	Sir Roger Norrington	2018
Orpheus Chamber Orchestra	–	2021
Britten Jeugd Strijkorkest	Loes Visser	2021

Source: Naxos Music Library and WorldCat

== Sources ==
- Day, Timothy (2004). "Elgar and Recording". In Grimley, Daniel; Julian Rushton (eds.). The Cambridge Companion to Elgar. Cambridge and New York: Cambridge University Press. ISBN 0-19-284017-7.
- Grimley, Daniel M. (2004). "A Smiling With a Sigh: The Chamber Music and Works for Strings". In Grimley, Daniel; Julian Rushton (eds.). The Cambridge Companion to Elgar. Cambridge and New York: Cambridge University Press. ISBN 0-19-284017-7.
- Kennedy, Michael (1987). Portrait of Elgar (third ed.). Oxford and New York: Oxford University Press. ISBN 0-19-284017-7.
- Moore, Jerrold Northrop (1987). Elgar and His Publishers: Letters of a Creative Life. Oxford: Clarendon Press. OCLC 1056822803.
- Moore, Jerrold Northrop (1999). Edward Elgar : A Creative Life. Oxford: Oxford University Press. ISBN 0-19-816366-5.
- Neill, Andrew (April 2022). "Majestic but Fiendishly Demanding: Interpreting Elgar's Introduction and Allegro for Strings". The Elgar Society Journal. 23 (1): 24–44. ISSN 0143-1269.
