= Kimi Sato =

Japanese composer (born 1949)

- Born: 5 March 1949 (age 77); Tokyo, Japan
- Other name: 佐藤 喜美
- Occupation: Composer

Kimi Sato (born 5 March 1949) is a Japanese composer.

== Biography ==
She was born in Sendai where she studied with Yoshiro Irino and graduated from the Toko Gakuen School of Music in Tokyo. She continued her studies at the Paris Conservatory with Olivier Messiaen, graduating in 1978. She returned to Japan in 1981 and was awarded the Prix de Rome in 1984, becoming the first foreign recipient of the prize.

== Works ==
Selected works include:

- Espace (1974)
- Aillerus... (1984)
- le cadre blanc (1972)
- Beyond Space, Sound (1976)
- le blu du ciel (1977)
