= Hisatada Otaka =

Japanese composer and conductor (1911–1951)

- 尾高尚忠
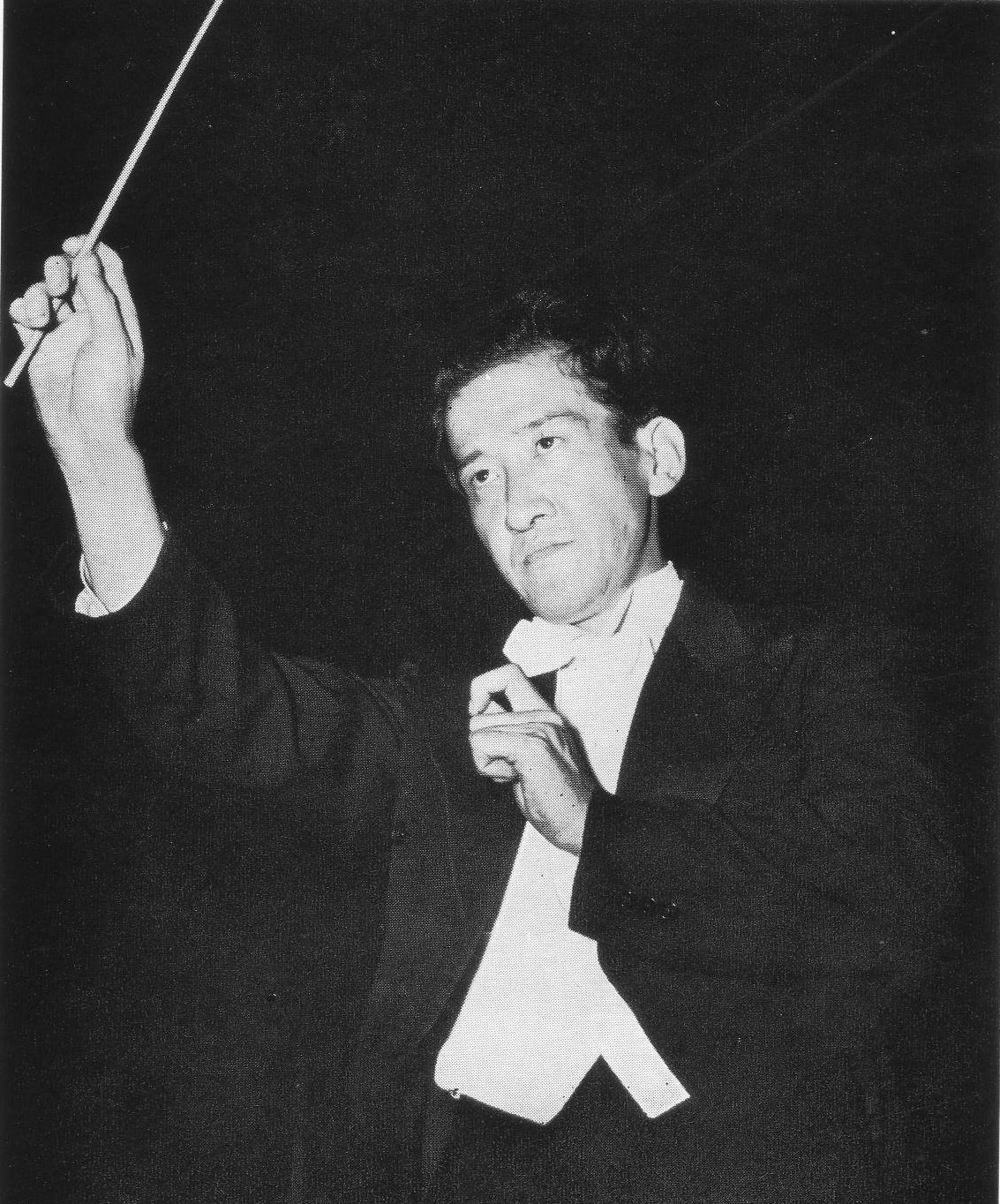
- Otaka in 1942
- Born: 26 September 1911; Tokyo, Japan
- Died: 16 February 1951 (aged 39); Japan
- Occupations: Conductor, Composer
- Children: Tadaaki Otaka, Atsutada Otaka, Michiko Otaki
- Relatives: grandfather: Eiichi Shibusawa (businessman)

Hisatada Otaka (Japanese: 尾高尚忠; 26 September 1911 – 16 February 1951) was a Japanese composer and conductor. He was the conductor of the NHK Symphony Orchestra from 1942 to 1951.

Otaka was born in Japan and studied in musical arts early, however he dropped out of high school and moved to Vienna for six years for conducting and composing, during his studies in Vienna he became friends with Andrzej Panufnik and started composing works. In 1940, Otaka moved back to Japan where he took the role as conductor for the NHK Symphony Orchestra, become a music teacher and compose most of his significant works such as his Symphony and Cello Concerto, however his life came to an abrupt end at the age of 39, leaving an unfinished Flute Concerto rewrite which one of his students, Hikaru Hayashi, would take on and complete.

When Otaka died he left behind three children, all of whom play his work regularly particularly the youngest son Tadaaki Otaka. In 1953, the NHK Symphony Orchestra created the Otaka Prize, which is named after Hisatada Otaka for his role in helping the orchestra. Otaka had written one of the first Japanese cello concertos and the first Japanese flute concerto, the latter being played regularly as Otaka's most famous work.

== Life ==
=== Early life, studies in Vienna ===
Hisatada Otaka was born in Tokyo on 26 September 1911, the youngest of 11 children, he was the 6th son of Jiro Otaka, a Japanese banker, businessman, however Jiro Otaka would die in 1920, when Hisatada Otaka was 9 years old. Hisatada's mother, Fumiko, was one of Viscount Shibusawa's daughters. Otaka studied at the Tokyo Prefectural Fifth Junior High School. After graduating there, Otaka decided to choose a career path in music and studied at the Seijo High School (which would become Seijo University), however he dropped out. To continue his music studies Otaka moved to Vienna to study music briefly from 1931 to 1932, he studied under Helda Janbert for piano, Richard Stehl for music theory. After the short stay, Otaka moved back to Japan to study composition with Klaus Pringsheim and piano with Leo Sirota. However, this too was short as he moved back to Vienna in 1934 to study composition with Joseph Marx, and conducting with Felix Weingartner, from his 6-year stay in Vienna (1934–1940), Otaka would be an active conductor and composer. In 1937, Otaka won a Japanese-European music competition for his first Japanese Suite, he was awarded by Felix Weingartner. In 1939, Otaka controversially conducted the Berlin Reichsorchester; as Otaka played Japanese pieces, this was seen as a symbol of Nazi–Japan relations, although Otaka never had an incident like this later on. At some point after 1936, Otaka and his wife Misao (who also played the piano) met and became friends with Andrzej Panufnik, who also came to Vienna to study conducting under Weingartner. The Panufnik and Otaka family would stay close and remain in contact, as Otaka's son, Tadaaki Otaka would perform Panufnik's works regularly.

=== Return to Japan ===
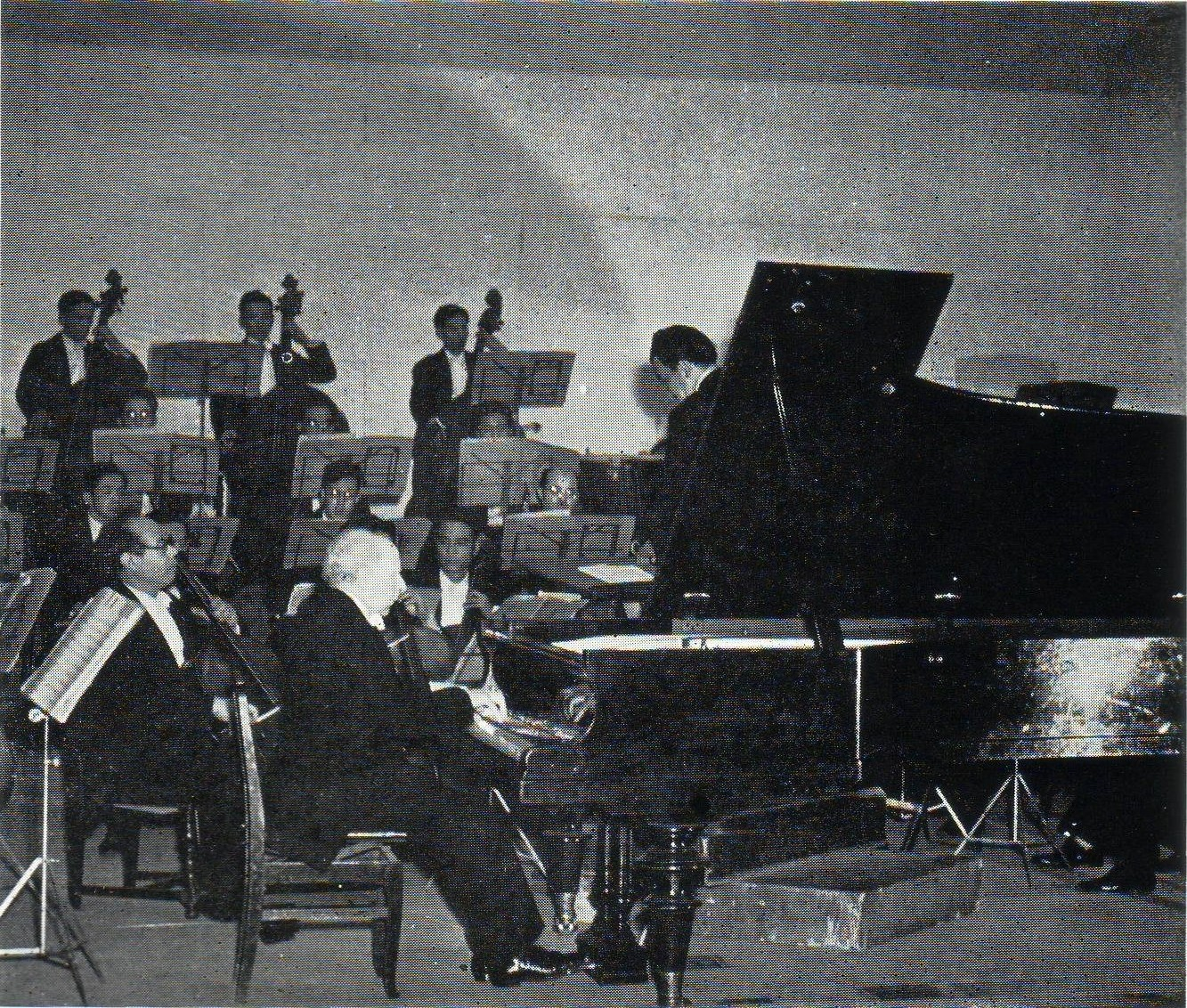
Hisatada Otaka conducting the Japan Symphony Orchestra, Lazare Lévy at piano. (1950)

In 1940, the Otakas left and moved to Japan, where Hisatada would live for the rest of his life. Initially he was assistant to Joseph Rosenstock, who was the conductor of the Japan Symphony Orchestra (also known at the time as the Nippon Symphony Orchestra, later known as the NHK Symphony Orchestra), and made his Japanese conducting debut in January 1941. In 1942 Otaka became a conductor of the orchestra, alongside Rosenstock, and Kazuo Yamada. (Note: Although Otaka was not a permanent conductor, as the NHK orchestra would not have any permanent conductors until 1951, he was one of the most frequent conductors of the orchestra.) Otaka was highly respected as a conductor until his sudden death in 1951, after which, he was succeeded by Kurt Wöss.

Besides conducting, Otaka also composed prolifically, and had taught Hikaru Hayashi, Kan Ishii, and Kikuko Kanai. Among Otaka's compositions are his first symphony ("Society for the Construction of the Bell Tower of Peace"), Cello Concerto (1944), Flute Concerto, and Rhapsody for Piano and Orchestra (1943).

=== Death and legacy ===
On 16 February 1951, Hisatada Otaka died at the age of 39, from what Andrzej Panufnik says was overwork.

Due to his significant contributions to, and long stay with, the Japanese Symphony Orchestra, the Otaka Prize was created in his honour. After his death, the orchestra's name changed to the NHK Symphony Orchestra because of funding received from NHK (Japanese Broadcasting Corporation).

Hisatada Otaka's youngest son, Tadaaki Otaka, conducts his father's work regularly, along with the works of Andrzej Panufnik.

Hisatada's other children, Michiko Otaki and Atsutada Otaki, also play his work. Such as the piano duet piece Midare.

=== Personal life ===
Hisatada Otaka married Misao Otaka sometime before 1940. According to Panufnik, they were already married when they would invite Panufnik to their house in Vienna, and they left Vienna for Japan in 1940.

When the couple moved to Japan, they had a daughter and two sons. Michiko Otaki (in or after 1940), the daughter, is a pianist. Atsutada Otaka (1944), the elder son, is a musicologist and a composer. Tadaaki Otaka, (1947), the younger son, is a popular Japanese conductor, a permanent conductor of the NHK Symphony Orchestra since 2010, the first Japanese person to win the Elgar Medal, and musical director of the Osaka Philharmonic Orchestra.

When Hisatada Otaka died in 1951, the couple's children were still very young (Tadaaki being only 4 years old), and therefore Misao was left as a widowed mother.

== Selected compositions ==
- Japanische Suite No. 1 (Nihon Kumikyoku) (Op. 12; 1936)
- Sinfonietta for Strings (1937)
- Japanische Suite No. 2 (Op. 18; Premiered 2 December 1939)
- Midare Capriccio for 2 pianos (Op. 11 1939; rev. 1947?) (Premiered 2 December 1939) (Note: Based on a 17th-century koto piece of the same name.)
- Sonatine for piano (Op. 13; 1940)
- Piano Trio (1941)
- Rhapsody for Piano and Orchestra (1943)
- Two string quartets
  - String Quartet No. 1 (1938)
  - String Quartet No. 2 (1943)
- Cello Concerto (1944) (Note: One of the first Japanese Cello concertos.)
- Poem for Soprano and Orchestra (c. 1944)
- Symphony No. 1 "Society for the Construction of the Bell Tower of Peace" (incomplete or partially lost) (Note: The symphony must contain more than two movements, because at the end of the 2nd movement it is labelled with attacca, meaning without pause, continue to the next movement, implying that there are more movements, either lost or not created; this is supported due to the recent discovery of the 2nd movement in 2006, which premiered on 2 or 3 September 2006 by the NHK Symphony Orchestra with conductor Yuzo Toyama. The symphony has no relation to the Japanese Peace Bell as that was created after Otaka's death, however was made with a description of "Praying for world peace.", referencing World War II, and the atomic bombings of Hiroshima and Nagasaki.) (Op. 35; 1948–1949)
  - Movements:
    - Maestoso – Allegro appassionato
    - Adagio assai sostenuto, molto espressivo ‒ Andante con moto, ma sempre sostenuto ‒ Adagio sostenuto
- Flute Concerto (Op. 30a 1948; 30b 1951) (Note: The flute concerto was originally completed in 1948 for chamber orchestra as Op. 30a, when it was finished it was the first Japanese flute concerto. In 1951, Hisatada Otaka started a rewrite for a bigger orchestra, but was left incomplete since Otaka's death that year, however his student, Hikaru Hayashi, completed the work in 1951 as Op. 30b. Otaka's son, Atsutada Otaka, made an arrangement of the work in 2001.)
- Concerto for Piano and String Symphony (????)

The most popular of Otaka's work is his flute concerto, which is played and recorded commonly, and was supported among his peers.

=== Style ===
Otaka's style reflects much of his teachers in the 1930s, showing Viennese and German styles. Although unlike his teacher Joseph Marx, Otaka stayed within the zone of tonality, going with more traditional later Romantic styles, rather than the growing atonal or modern styles. Many of his pieces like the Cello Concerto, Midare, Symphony No. 1 – "The Construction of the Bell Tower of Peace" still keep in tune with his original Japanese-music style and culture. As such, Otaka's pieces result in a combination between eastern Japanese styles, and older tonal Germanic-Viennese style, even during his early studies in Vienna, Otaka showed Japanese traditional music, such as in his Japanische Suites, where Otaka made his pieces deliberately to "find new means of expression for the Japanese spirit... into the western tonal language", which was different compared to some of his peers who wrote only focusing on the European musicality.

Flute concerto

However, the flute concerto Op. 30 is written in a specific French romantic style, although with distinct sections Japanese themes, it is written differently than many other concert works by Otaka, seemingly independent from the style of his teachers from Germany and Vienna, The Guardian said the piece had a "jazzy inflection" during the slower movement of the concerto, due to the French style and structure many French flautists performed the piece such as Jean-Pierre Rampal and Emmanuel Pahud and was popular in France.
