= Yasuo Kuwahara =

Japanese mandolin player and composer

Yasuo Kuwahara

Yasuo Kuwahara (桑原 康雄, Kuwahara Yasuo; December 12, 1946, in Kobe, Japan – December 6, 2003) was a Japanese mandolin player and composer for mandolin orchestra. He was chairman of various musical institutions and organizations, including the Nara National Women's College, the Kuwahara Mandolin Institute and the Japan Association of Music Exchange. In addition, he taught composition and artistic mandolin.

After completing his studies with Professor Kinuko Hiruma, he became well known in Japan for his musical solo performances on the mandolin and outstanding technique. He made his European debut at a Zupfmusikfestival in Mannheim in 1982, and as a result, the European plucked-stringed orchestra circles became aware of him. After his performance in 1983 in Providence, USA, Yasuo Kuwahara was also known in North America. After that he won increasing worldwide recognition and fame for his playing and compositions, performing in his native Japan, as well as Italy, France, Germany, Switzerland, Sweden, Denmark, Spain, Austria, Belgium, Australia, Russia and the United States of America. His compositions include works for the mandolin orchestra, as well as chamber ensembles and soloists.

== Major works ==
=== Orchestral ===
- Angels Move "籟動", Mandolin Concerto

=== Mandolin orchestra ===
- Dance of Fire Festival
- Beyond the Rainbow
- Song of the Japanese Autumn
- Novemberfest
- Railroad song
- Steamy Steaming
- Outward of Forest
- Pear-shaped Dance
- Within the Fence

=== Mandolin solo ===
- Moon and Yamanba
- Jongara
- Winter Light
- Impromptu
- Perpetual Movement
- Silent Door
- Improvised Poem

== Compositions ==
Yasuo Kuwahara's expressive compositions tell stories in musical fashion. The Song of Japanese Autumn describes the "struggle of peasants" in the early fall against the time when the autumn gales fall with heavy showers, and the stillness afterward when the weather calms down again at the end of the piece — all told musically with "accented rhythm", "agitated melody", tremolo and peaceful cadenza.

Characteristic of Kuwahara's pieces are long traditional (for Japanese compositions) expressive tremolo passages, but he also weaved modern playing techniques into his compositions. This was taken to the extreme in his orchestral work Novemberfest, in which he integrated seven different mandolin-voice percussive effects. Instead of the mandolin's normal plucking-of-strings with a pick, or using tremolo, sound is made with fingers, knuckles or the plectrum knocked on different parts of the instrument. Yasuo Kuwahara was also known to use stylistic elements of contemporary music in his compositions, such as Minimal music.

== Recordings of his compositions ==
- Clicking Ecstasy by Mülheimer Zupforchester, Detlef Tewes conducting, 1998:

Track 7, The Song of the Japanese Autumn: I. Andante
Track 8, The Song of the Japanese Autumn: II. Allegro non troppo
Track 9, The Song of the Japanese Autumn: III. Meno mosso
Track 10, The Song of the Japanese Autumn: IV. Allegro non troppo
Track 11, The Song of the Japanese Autumn: V. Andante

== See also ==
- List of mandolinists (sorted)
- List of Japanese composers
