= Yoshirō Irino =

Japanese composer (1921–1980)

Yoshirō Vladimir Irino
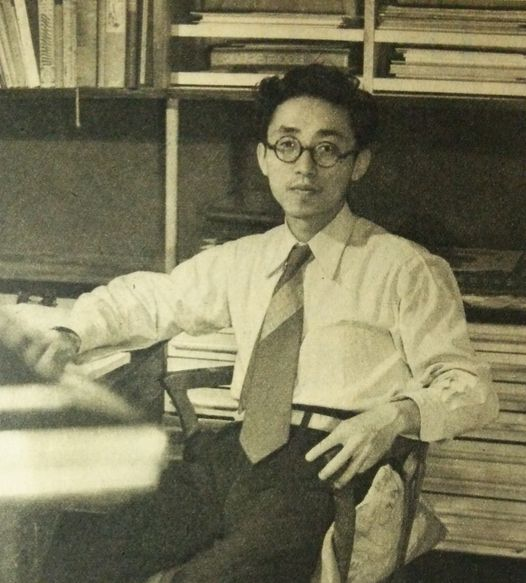
- Born: 13 November 1921; Soviet Union
- Died: 28 June 1980 (aged 58); Japan
- Occupation: Composer

Yoshirō Vladimir Irino (入野 義朗, Irino Yoshirō; 13 November 1921, in Vladivostok – 28 June 1980, in Tokyo) was a Japanese composer.

== Biography ==
Irino was born in Soviet Vladivostok. He attended high school in Tokyo and went on to study economics at Tokyo Imperial University (now University of Tokyo).

After World War II, Irino, along with colleagues Minao Shibata and Kunio Toda, studied the twelve-tone method of composition devised by Arnold Schoenberg. In 1951, Irino used the composition technique to compose his Concerto da Camera for Seven Instruments. This work is credited to be the first Japanese dodecaphonic composition. During the same time, the magazine Ongaku Geijutsu published two articles by Irino: "Schoenberg's Composing Technique" and "What is Twelve-Tone Music?". Subsequently, Irino used the twelve-tone technique in numerous compositions and wrote extensively about contemporary music. Working to introduce foreign contemporary music and music literature to Japan, he made Japanese translations of important books such as Die Komposition mit zwölf Tönen (12音による作曲技法) by Josef Rufer and Schoenberg and His School (シェーンベルクとその楽派) by René Leibowitz. Irino did not, however, compose serial music, a technique of the same period widely used with the Darmstadt School.

In 1973, the Asian Composers League was established by Irino and his colleagues. After his death, the Irino Award and the Yoshiro Irino Memorial Prize (sponsored by the Asian Composers League) were established to promote young composers. Notable students include Kimi Sato.

== Awards ==
- 6th Mainichi Music Award for Sinfonietta (1953)
- 6th Odaka Award for Concerto Grosso for Double String and Wind Orchestras (1957)
- 8th Odaka Award for Symphonia (1959)

== Works ==
Yoshirō Irino's music is mainly published by Zen-On Music Company Ltd, Ongaku No Tomo Sha, Japan Federation of Composers (日本作曲家協議会, Nihon sakkyokuka kyōgikai)

Stage works

- The Damask Drum (綾の鼓, Aya no tsuzumi), Music for the Noh Drama (1962)

Orchestra

- Adagietto and Allegro Vivace (1949)
- Sinfonietta for Small Orchestra (1953)
- Ricercari for Small Orchestra (1954)
- Double Concerto for Violin, Piano and Orchestra (1955)
- Concerto Grosso for Double String and Wind Orchestras (1957)
- Symphonia (1959)
- Concerto for String Orchestra (1960)
- Music for Harpsichord, Percussion and 19 Strings (1963)
- Symphonia No. 2 (1964)
- Theme and Variations (1967)
- Wandlungen (転, Ten) for Two Shakuhachi and Orchestra (1973)

Jazz band

- Suite for Jazz Band (1960)

Chamber music

- Sonata for Cello and Piano (1945)
- String Quartet No. 1 (1945)
- Sonatina for Flute and Piano (1946)
- Piano Trio, Op. 4 (1948)
- String Sextet (1950)
- Concerto da Camera for Seven Instruments (1951)
- Quintet for Clarinet, Alto Saxophone, Trumpet, Cello and Piano (1958)
- Divertimento for Seven Winds (1958)
- Music for Violin and Cello (1959)
- Music for Vibraphone and Piano (1961)
- Partita for Wind Quintet (1962)
- String Trio (1965)
- Three Movements for Two Kotos and Jūshichi-gen (1966)
- Seven Inventions for Guitar and Six Players (1967)
- Sonata for Violin and Piano (1967)
- Duo concertante for Shakuhachi and Koto (1968)
- Three Movements for Cello Solo (1969)
- Sonata for Four Players (1970)
- Trio for H.R.S. '70 for Flute, Violin and Harpsichord (1970)
- Globus I for Horn and Percussion (1971)
- Suite for Viola Solo (1971)
- Globus II for Marimba, Percussion and Double Bass (1971)
- Strömung for Flute, Harp and Percussion (1973)
- Globus III for Hichiriki, Violin, Cello Harp, Piano and Two Dancers (1975)
- Klänge for Piano and Percussion (1976)
- Movements (運動, Undō) for Marimba Solo (1977)
- Cosmos for Shakuhachi, Two Sō (Koto), Violin, Piano and Percussion (1978)

Piano

- Variations (1943)
- Three Pieces (1958)
- Music for Two Pianos (1963)
- Pépé on a Spring Day (ある日のペペ, Aru hi no pepe) (1967)
- Three Little Pieces (1967–68)
- Four Small Pieces (1969)
- Piano Pieces for Children (1972–75)

Vocal

- White Box (白い箱, Shiroi hako) (1959)
- Three Choruses on Tōhoku Folk Songs (東北民謡による三つの混声合唱, Tōhoku min'yō ni yoru mittsu no konsei gasshō) for Mixed Chorus and Percussion (1960)
- White Nights (白夜, Hakuya) (1966)
- Hyōdan (評弾, Hyōdan) for Soprano and Tenor with Harp and Harpsichord (1977)

Film music

- 海は生きている (Umi wa ikiteiru) (1958)
- 性生活の知恵 (Seiseikatsu no chie) (1961)
- The Sport of Beasts (獣の戯れ, Kemono no tawamure) (1964); based on the novel by Yukio Mishima

School songs

- Irino wrote school songs for about two dozen Japanese schools.
