= Umi Yukaba =

Japanese song

Song
- Genre: Gunka
- Composers: Kiyoshi Nobutoki, 1937
- Lyricists: Ōtomo no Yakamochi, AD 759

Umi Yukaba
Sung by the Tokyo Music School band (now the Tokyo University of the Arts)

"Umi Yukaba" (海行かば) is a Japanese song whose lyrics are based on a chōka poem by Ōtomo no Yakamochi in the Man'yōshū (poem 4094), an eighth century anthology of Japanese poetry, set to music by Kiyoshi Nobutoki.

== History ==
The poem is part of Ōtomo no Yakamochi's famous long poem celebrating the imperial edict on the discovery of gold in Michinoku province (modern Tohoku) in 749. The distant ancestors of the Ōtomo clan were known as masters of the royal Kume guard. The poem reflects their pledge to serve their sovereign.

"Umi Yukaba" later became popular among the military, especially with the Imperial Japanese Navy. As set to music in 1937 by Kiyoshi Nobutoki (信時 潔, Nobutoki Kiyoshi) it became popular during World War II, and was sung frequently by kamikaze pilots before takeoffs. After Japan surrendered in 1945, "Umi Yukaba" and other gunka were banned by the Allied occupation forces. With the ending of the occupation, the song has now been widely played across military circles in Japan, including performances by the Japan Maritime Self-Defense Force.

Prior to Nobutoki’s composition, the poem had been set to music in the trio section of the Gunkan kōshinkyoku.

== Lyrics ==
Japanese original (with ruby characters)

海(うみ)行(ゆ)かば 水(み)漬(づ)く屍(かばね)
山(やま)行(ゆ)かば 草(くさ)生(む)す屍(かばね)
大(おほ)君(きみ)の 辺(へ)にこそ死(し)なめ
かへりみはせじ

Romanization

Umi yukaba Mizuku kabane
Yama yukaba Kusa musu kabane
Ookimi no he ni koso shiname
Kaerimi wa seji

English translation

At sea be my body water-soaked,
On land be it with grass overgrown.
Let me die by the side of my Sovereign !
Never will I look back.

== In popular culture ==
- Umi Yukaba is also the name of a 1983 Japanese film.
- "Umi Yukaba" is featured in the 1970 film Tora! Tora! Tora!.

== See also ==
- Man'yōshū
- "Kimigayo"
