= Yoko Noge =

Japanese-born jazz and blues singer, pianist and composer (born 1957)

Yoko Noge (born 1957) is a Japanese-born jazz and blues singer, pianist, and composer.

== Early life ==
A native of Osaka, Noge took piano lessons for a brief period in childhood; growing up in Osaka in the 1960s and 1970s led to heavy exposure to the blues. As a teenager, she and several fellow students from her high school formed the Yoko Blues Band, which earned first prize, and a recording contract, in a television contest.

== Career ==
Attracted by the blues scene in the city, Noge moved to Chicago in 1984 to pursue a career in jazz and blues; beginning as a singer, she took piano lessons from Erwin Helfer and in the early 1990s established the Jazz Me Blues Band, which has since become a fixture on the Chicago musical scene. She has written a number of compositions for her group which blend ideas from Japanese folk music with Chicago blues. Noge cofounded the Chicago Asian American Jazz Festival in 1995 with Tatsu Aoki and Francis Wong. In 2006 the Chicago Tribune named her "Chicagoan of the Year", and in 2009 Newsweek Japan identified her as "one of the most respected Japanese people in the world". She received the Foreign Minister's Commendation from the Japanese government in 2014. Noge is married to saxophonist Clark Dean.
