= Kikuko Kanai =

Japanese composer (1911–1986)

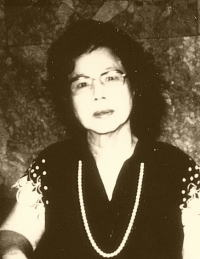
- Born: 13 March 1911; Miyako Islands, Japan
- Died: 17 February 1986 (aged 74)
- Other name: 金井 喜久子
- Occupation: composer

Kikuko Kanai (金井 喜久子, Kanai Kikuko; née Kawahira, 13 March 1911 – 17 February 1986) was a Japanese composer and one of the first Japanese women to compose classical music in the Western tradition.

== Biography ==
Kikuko Kawahira was born on the Ryukyu island of Miyako-jima, Okinawa, and studied voice at the Nihon Music School and composition at Tokyo Music School. She studied with teachers including with Taijiro Goh, Kanichi Shimofusa, Hisatada Otaka and Kishio Hirao. Working as a composer, she produced songs and orchestral music using the Ryukyuan pentatonic scale.

In 1954 she studied the dodecaphonic method in Brazil with Hans-Joachim Koellreutter, and incorporated atonal composition into her work. She was awarded the Mainichi Prize for Cultural Publication in 1955, and a prize by the Okinawan government for her opera Okinawa monogatari in 1968. She died in Tokyo.

The BBC describe her as "one of the first Japanese women to compose Western classical music".

== Works ==
Selected works include:

- Ryūkyū no min’yō ('Folksongs of Ryūkyū') 1954
- Okinawa monogatari opera
- Miyako-jima engi (Legend of Miyako Island) (ballet), 1949
- Ryūkyū hiwa (A Hidden Story of Ryūkyū) (jazz ballet), 1951
- Hiren Karafune (Love Tragedy on Tang Boat) (op, 4, Kanai and K. Yano), 1960
- Okinawa monogatari (Tale of Okinawa), 1997
- Symphony, no.1, 1938
- Okinawa buyō kumikyoku (Okinawan Dance Suite): no.1, 1940, no.2, 1946
- Ryūkyū kyōsōkyoku (Ryūkyū Rhapsody) no.1, 1946
- Symphony, no.2, 1946
- Uruma no shi (Poem on Uruma), 1952
- Festival Overture 'Hishō', 1972
- Ryūkyū kyōsōkyoku no.2, pianoforte octet, 1950
- Ryūkyū Ballade, pianoforte, 1951
- Sonata, violin, pianoforte, 1952
- Brazil Rhapsody, pianoforte, 1955
- Hamachidori hensōkyoku (Variations on Hamachidori), koto, Electone, percussion, 1970
- Okinawa min'yō niyoru gasshōkyoku-shū (Choral Pieces on Okinawan Folksongs), 1953–60
- Haha to ko no Okinawa no uta (Okinawan Songs for a Mother and Children), 1965

Her work has been recorded and issued on CD, including:

- Just For Me - Noriko Ogawa plays Japanese piano music (1997) BIS
- Bridges to Japan Audio CD (17 October 2000) Bis, ASIN: B0000508RU
