= Mitsukuri Shūkichi =

Japanese composer (1895–1971)

- 箕作秋吉
- Born: 21 October 1895; Tokyo, Empire of Japan
- Died: 10 May 1971 (aged 75); Chigasaki, Japan
- Occupation: Composer

Mitsukuri Shūkichi (箕作秋吉; 21 October 1895 – 10 May 1971) was a Japanese composer. His work was part of the music event in the art competition at the 1936 Summer Olympics.
