= Mareo Ishiketa =

Japanese composer (1916–1996)

Mareo Ishiketa (石桁真礼生, 26 November 1916 in Wakayama – 22 August 1996) was a Japanese composer. Ishiketa was taught composition by Kan'ichi Shimofusa, and graduated in 1939 from the Tokyo School of Music.

== Works, editions and recordings ==
- Furusato no (In my homeland) - recording by Kazumichi Ohno (tenor), Kyosuke Kobayashi (piano). Thorofon CD.
