= Joseph Wolfe =

English conductor

Joseph Wolfe is an English conductor, the son of London Symphony Orchestra conductor Sir Colin Davis and Lady Davis (Ashraf Naini).
