= Motoharu Kawashima =

Japanese composer

- Born: 12 January 1972; Tokyo, Japan
- Other name: 川島 素晴
- Occupation: Composer

Motoharu Kawashima (川島素晴; surname Kawashima; born 12 January 1972 in Tokyo, Japan) is a Japanese composer of contemporary classical music.

== Life and career ==
Kawashima studied composition from 1991 to 1996 with Isao Matsushita and Jo Kondo at the Tokyo National University of Fine Arts and Music. He won the Akiyoshidai International Composition Prize and made his debut in Akiyoshidai International 20th Century Classical Music Festival in 1992. Currently, he teaches composition at the Kunitachi College of Music. While at the college, Kawashima taught future music producer Yaffle.

He won the Best Notation Prize in Darmstadt International Summer Courses for New Music in 1994.

His scores are published by the Zen-On Music Company Ltd Limited Baerenreiter.
