= Colin Davis =

English conductor (1927–2013)

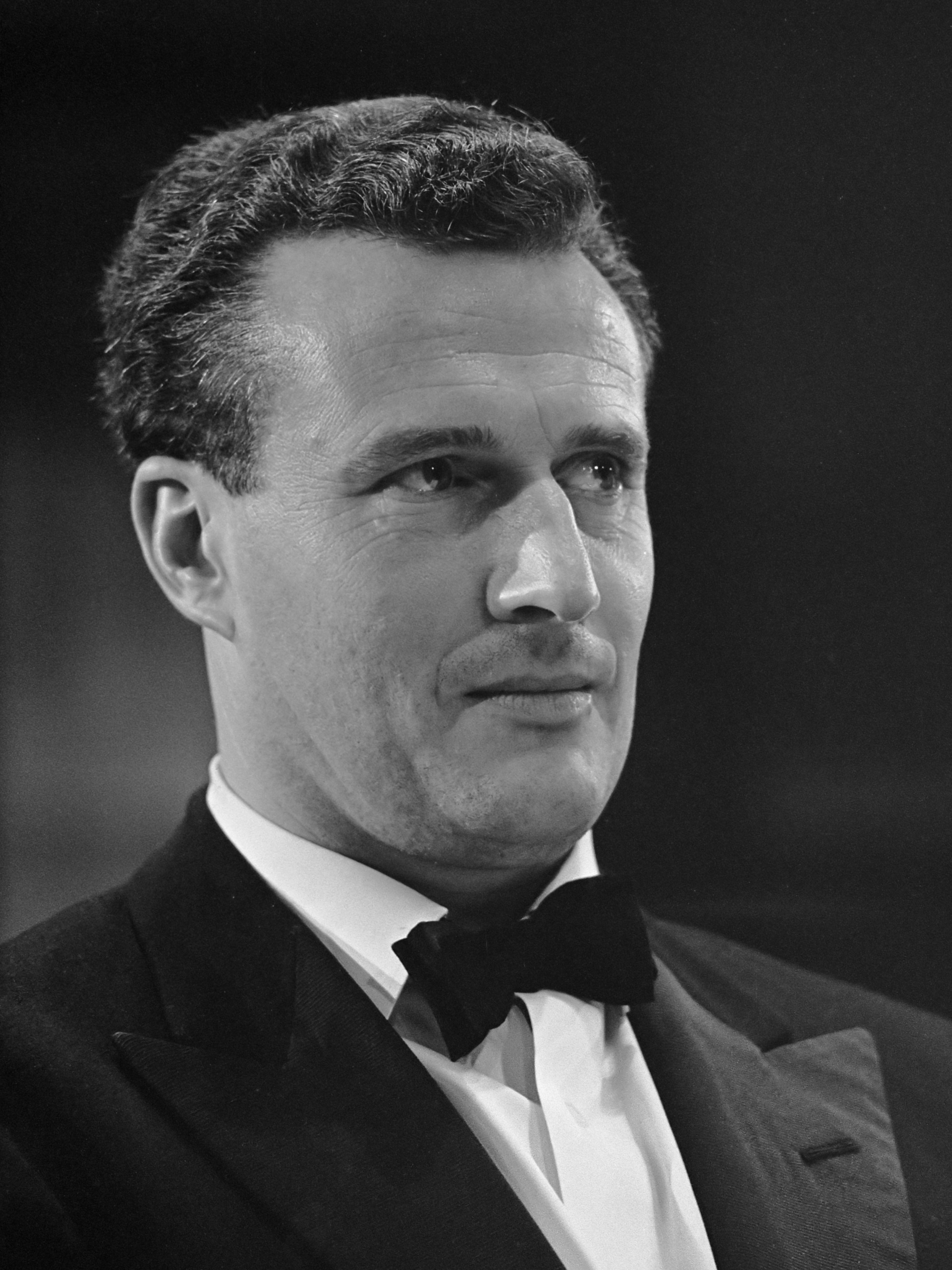
Davis in 1967

Sir Colin Rex Davis CH CBE (25 September 1927 – 14 April 2013) was an English conductor, known for his association with the London Symphony Orchestra, having first conducted it in 1959. His repertoire was broad, but among the composers with whom he was particularly associated were Mozart, Berlioz, Elgar, Sibelius, Stravinsky and Tippett.

Davis studied as a clarinetist, but was intent on becoming a conductor. After struggling as a freelance conductor from 1949 to 1957, he gained a series of appointments with orchestras including the BBC Scottish Orchestra, the BBC Symphony Orchestra and the Bavarian Radio Symphony Orchestra. He also held the musical directorships of Sadler's Wells Opera and the Royal Opera House, where he was principal conductor for over fifteen years. His guest conductorships included the Boston Symphony Orchestra, the New York Philharmonic and the Staatskapelle Dresden, among many others.

As a teacher, Davis held posts at the Royal Academy of Music, London, and the Landesgymnasium für Musik "Carl Maria von Weber" (preparatory school for music) in Dresden. He made his first gramophone recordings in 1958, and his discography over the next five decades was extensive, with many studio recordings for Philips Records and a substantial catalogue of live recordings for the London Symphony Orchestra's own label.

== Early years ==
Davis was born in Weybridge, Surrey, the fifth of seven children, to Reginald George Davis (a bank clerk) and Lillian Constance (Colbran) Davis. The family was musical, and he was exposed to music from an early age. He recalled:

"I can still see Sargent conducting the first concert I ever attended. I can still hear Melchior in the final scene of Siegfried – an old 78 playing on my father's gramophone. … I can also remember the moment I decided to make music my life. I was 13 or 14 at the time and the performance was of Beethoven's Eighth. Doors were suddenly opened. I became totally involved, even obsessed by music, although I was frightfully enclosed by my likes and dislikes. Today I'm game for anything."

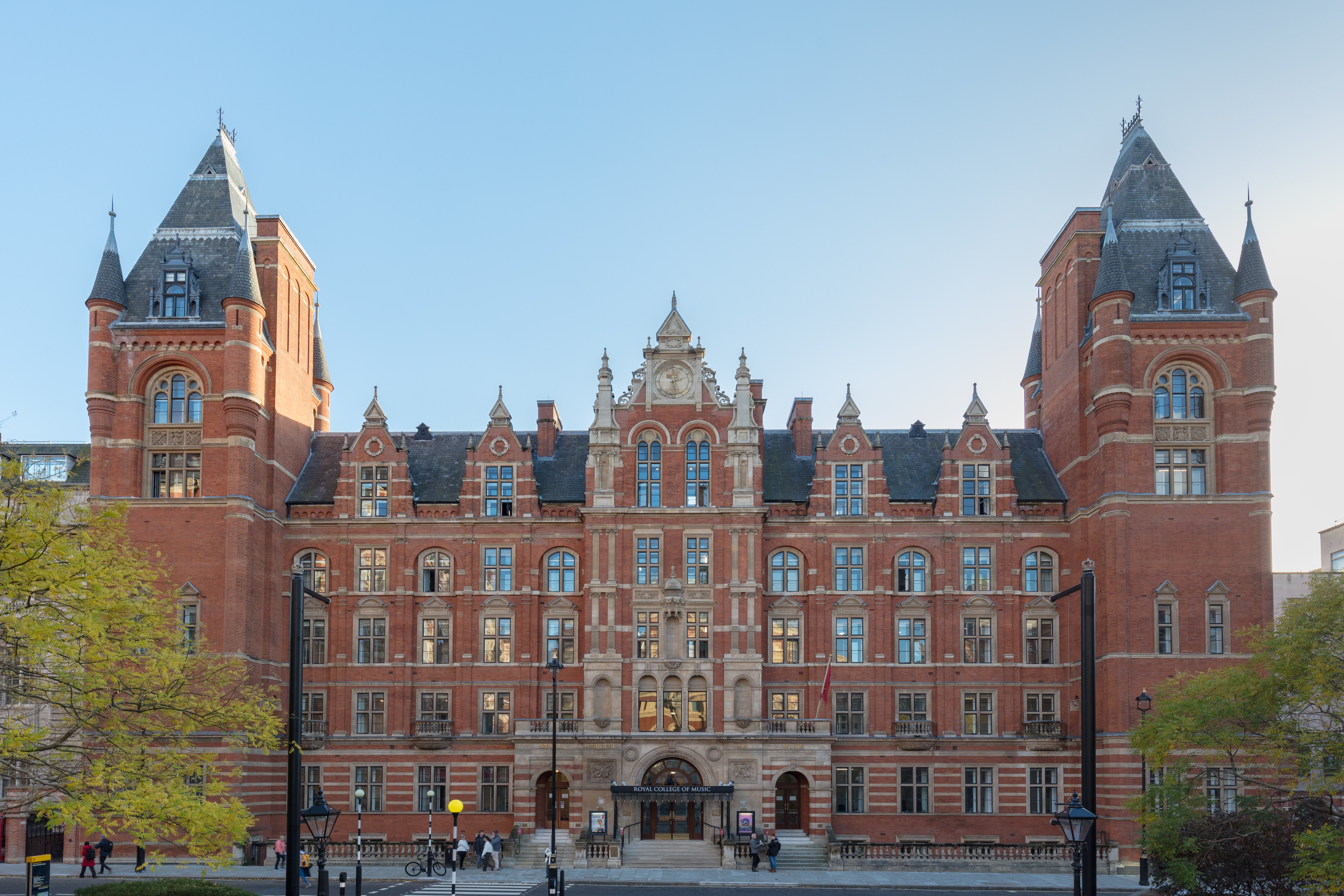
The Royal College of Music, where Davis studied

With financial assistance from his great-uncle, Davis was educated at Christ's Hospital in Sussex and then won a scholarship to the Royal College of Music in London, where he studied the clarinet with Frederick Thurston. His fellow-students included Gervase de Peyer, but Davis developed a greater interest in conducting. He was, however, not eligible for the conducting class at the college, because he could not play the piano.

Following compulsory military service and completing his studies at college, Davis served as a clarinettist in the band of the Life Guards. Stationed at Windsor, he had continual opportunities to attend concerts in London under conductors including Sir Thomas Beecham and Bruno Walter. In 1949, he began his career as a freelance musician (the "freelance wilderness", in his own phrase) where he remained until 1957. His first conducting work was with the Kalmar Orchestra, which he co-founded with other former students of the Royal College. He was subsequently invited to conduct the recently founded Chelsea Opera Group in Don Giovanni. In the early years of his career, he also took some engagements as an orchestral clarinettist. What seemed at first to be a full-time conducting appointment, for the Original Ballet Russe in 1952, ended abruptly after three months, when the company collapsed. In between sparse conducting engagements, Davis worked as a coach and lecturer, including spells at the Cambridge University Musical Society and the Bryanston Summer School, where a performance of L'enfance du Christ awakened his love of Berlioz's music.

== BBC and Sadler's Wells ==
His first breakthrough came in 1957 when, at his third attempt, he secured the post of assistant conductor of the BBC Scottish Orchestra (now the BBC Scottish Symphony Orchestra). The chief conductor of the orchestra generally chose to conduct the standard repertoire pieces himself, and left Davis with modern works and non-standard repertoire works, including those of Berlioz. By 1959, Davis had developed to the extent that, after a concert of Stravinsky and Mozart with the London Mozart Players, the chief music critic of The Observer, Peter Heyworth, wrote:

"Mr Davis conducted two works in a manner that showed that he is not only outstanding among our younger conductors, but probably the best we have produced since Sir Thomas Beecham, his senior by forty-eight years."

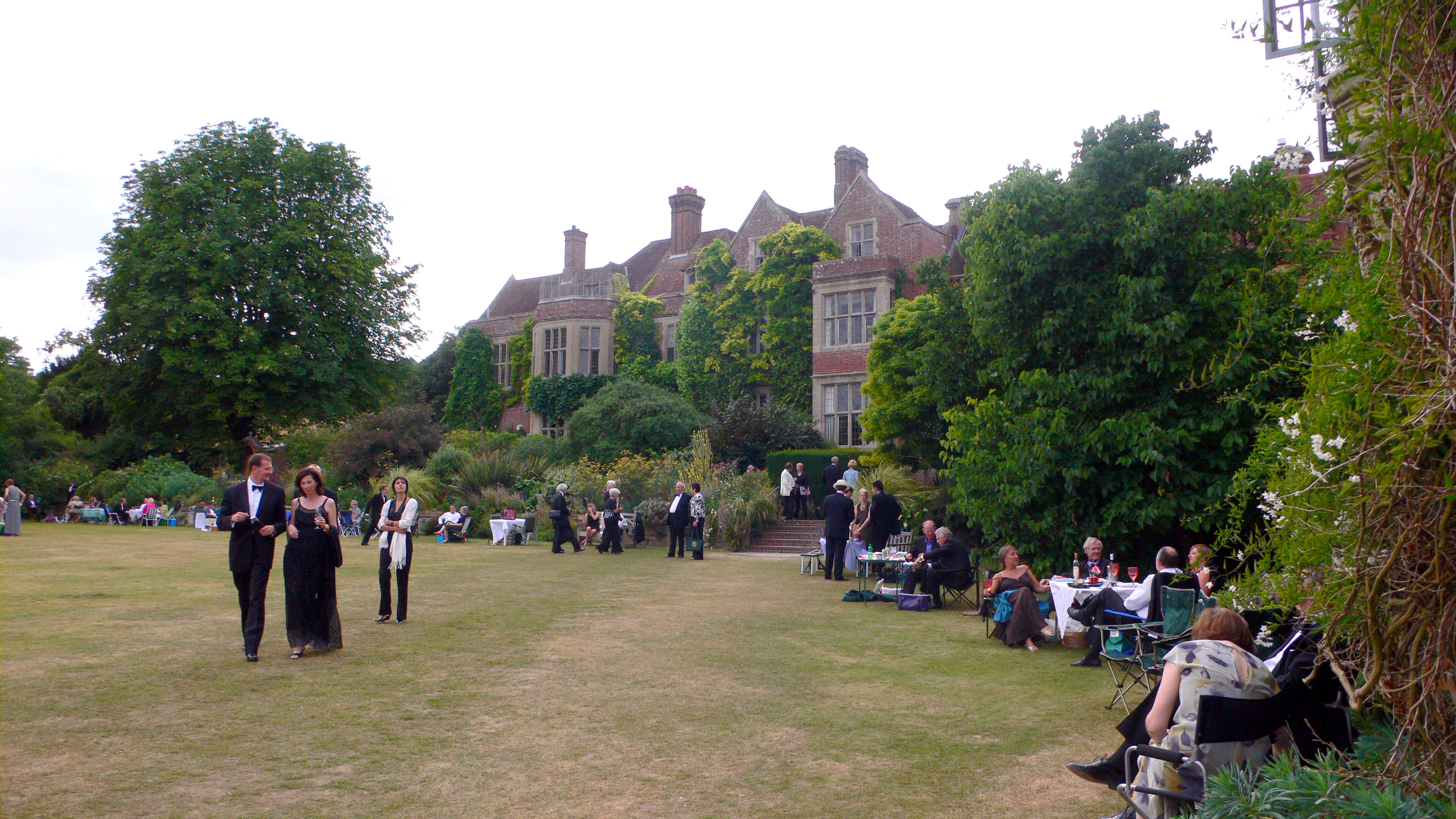
Glyndebourne, scene of one of Davis's early breakthroughs

Davis first found wide acclaim when he stood in for an ill Otto Klemperer in a performance of Don Giovanni, at the Royal Festival Hall in 1959. A year later, Beecham invited him to collaborate with him in preparing The Magic Flute at Glyndebourne. Beecham was taken ill, and Davis conducted the opera. After the Don Giovanni, The Times wrote, "A superb conductor of Mozart declared himself last night at the Festival Hall…. Mr Davis emerged as a conductor ripe for greatness." Neville Cardus in The Guardian was less enthusiastic but nevertheless considered that he "had his triumphs" in the performance. After The Magic Flute, The Times called Davis "master of Mozart's idiom, style and significance", although Heyworth in The Observer was disappointed by his tempi, judging them to be too slow.

In 1960, Davis made his début at the Proms in a programme of Britten, Schumann, Mozart and Berlioz. In the same year, he was appointed chief conductor of Sadler's Wells Opera, and in 1961 he was made musical director of the company, with whom he built up a large repertoire of operas, conducting in London and on tour. Grove's Dictionary of Music and Musicians wrote of this period, "He excelled in Idomeneo, The Rake's Progress and Oedipus rex, and Fidelio; his Wagner, Verdi and Puccini were less successful. He introduced Weill's Mahagonny, and Pizzetti's Assassinio nella cattedrale to the British public and conducted the première of Bennett's The Mines of Sulphur (1965)." Together with the stage director Glen Byam Shaw, he worked to present operas in a way that gave due weight to the drama as well as the music. In his early years, Davis was known as something of a firebrand with a short fuse in rehearsals, and his departure from Sadler's Wells in 1965 was not without acrimony.

After he left Sadler's Wells, and being passed over as principal conductor of the London Symphony Orchestra, Davis was named chief conductor of the BBC Symphony Orchestra (BBC SO), effective September 1967. At first, in the general view of the public, his tenure was overshadowed, at least during the Proms, by the memory of Sir Malcolm Sargent. Compared to the "suave father figure" image of Sargent to the promenaders, it took some time for the much younger Davis to be accepted. The BBC's official historian of the Proms later wrote, "Davis never really identified himself with the Proms in the way that Sargent had done. Davis was uncomfortable with the traditional hullabaloo of the Last Night of the Proms and attempted, unsuccessfully, to modernise it. The BBC's Controller of Music, William Glock, was a long-standing admirer of Davis, and encouraged him to put on adventurous programmes, with a new emphasis on modern music, both at the Proms and throughout the rest of the orchestra's annual schedule. Following his tenure as BBC SO chief conductor, Davis served as chief guest conductor of the BBC SO from 1971 to 1976.

== Covent Garden ==
In 1970, Sir David Webster, who ran the Royal Opera and the Royal Ballet companies at Covent Garden, invited Davis to succeed Sir Georg Solti as principal conductor of the opera. At about the same time, the Boston Symphony Orchestra invited him to become its musical director, but Davis felt that if Covent Garden needed him, it was his duty to take on the post. Webster's vision was that Davis and the stage director Sir Peter Hall, formerly of the Royal Shakespeare Company, would work in equal partnership as musical director and director of productions. After early successes together, including the première of Michael Tippett's The Knot Garden in December 1970, Hall left to succeed Laurence Olivier as director of the National Theatre. Webster had retired by that time, leaving Davis, together with Webster's successor as General Administrator, Sir John Tooley, to run the Royal Opera.

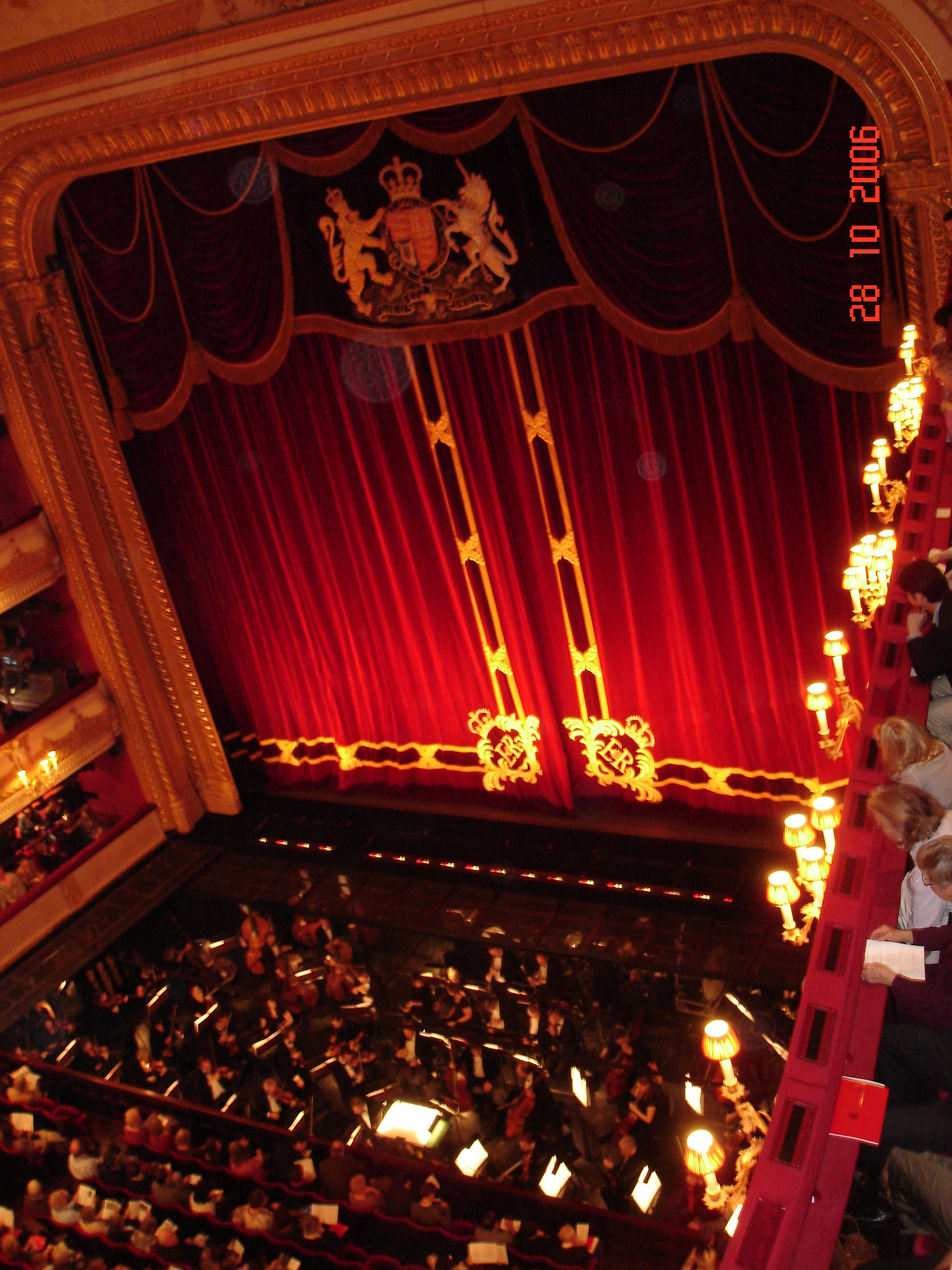
The Royal Opera House, Covent Garden, where Davis was musical director between 1970 and 1986

Davis' early months in charge at Covent Garden were marked by dissatisfaction among some of the audience, and booing was heard at a "disastrous" Nabucco in 1972. His conducting of Wagner's Ring cycle was at first compared unfavourably with that of his predecessor. Among his successes were Berlioz's massive Les Troyens (with Jon Vickers and Anja Silja) and Benvenuto Cellini, Verdi's Falstaff, the major Mozart operas, and, as one critic put it, he "confirmed his preeminence as a Britten and Stravinsky interpreter" with productions of Peter Grimes and The Rake's Progress. Davis conducted more than 30 operas during his fifteen-year tenure, but "since people like Maazel, Abbado and Muti would only come for new productions", Davis yielded the baton to these foreign conductors, giving up the chance to conduct several major operas, including Der Rosenkavalier, Rigoletto and Aida.

In addition to the standard operatic repertoire, Davis conducted a number of modern and unfamiliar operas, including Tippett's The Knot Garden and The Ice Break (of which he is the dedicatee), and Alexander Zemlinsky's The Dwarf and Eine florentinische Tragödie. With later stage directors at Covent Garden, Davis preferred to work with those who respected the libretto: "I have a hankering for producers who don't feel jealous of composers for being better than they are, and want to impose their, often admittedly clever, ideas on the work in hand." Davis hoped that Götz Friedrich, with whom he worked on Wagner's Ring cycle, would take on the role of principal producer vacated by Hall, "but it seemed that nobody wanted to commit themselves."

During his Covent Garden tenure, Davis returned to the BBC Symphony Orchestra as principal guest conductor from 1971 to 1975, and held the same post with the Boston Symphony Orchestra from 1972 to 1984. In 1977, he became the first English conductor to appear at Bayreuth, where he conducted the opening opera of the festival, Tannhäuser. Despite the Bayreuth habitués' suspicion of newcomers, his Tannhäuser was "highly successful". He debuted at the Metropolitan Opera, New York City, in 1967 with Peter Grimes, the Vienna State Opera in 1986 and the Bavarian State Opera in 1994.

== Bavarian Radio Symphony and London Symphony Orchestras ==
From 1983 to 1993, Davis was chief conductor of the Bavarian Radio Symphony Orchestra, with whom he developed his concert hall repertoire, including symphonies by Bruckner and Mahler. He was offered but declined the music directorships of the Cleveland Orchestra in succession to Maazel and the New York Philharmonic in succession to Zubin Mehta. As a principal guest conductor he was associated with the Dresden Staatskapelle, which appointed him honorary conductor (Ehrendirigent) in 1990, the first in the orchestra's 460-year-history, and whose musicians referred to Davis with the nickname "Der Sir". From 1998 to 2003, he was principal guest conductor of the New York Philharmonic.

In 1995, Davis was appointed principal conductor of the London Symphony Orchestra, the culmination of a long association with the orchestra. He had first conducted the LSO in 1959, and in 1964 he headed the orchestra's first world tour. He became principal guest conductor in 1975 and was at the helm in the LSO's first major series at its new home, the Barbican Centre, in a Berlioz/Tippett festival in 1983. In 1997 he conducted the LSO's first residency at Lincoln Center in New York City. Davis was the longest-serving principal conductor in the history of the LSO, holding the post from 1995 until 2006, after which the orchestra appointed him its President, an honour previously held only by Arthur Bliss, William Walton, Karl Böhm and Leonard Bernstein. On 21 June 2009, 50 years to the day after his first LSO performance, a special concert was given at the Barbican, at which present-day players were joined by many past members of the orchestra. His programme for the concert was Mozart's Symphony No 40 in G minor, and Brahms's Piano Concerto No 2, with Nelson Freire as soloist.

During his time with the LSO, both as principal conductor and later as president, Davis conducted series and cycles of the music of Sibelius, Berlioz, Bruckner, Mozart, Elgar, Beethoven, and Brahms, and in 2009 began presenting a cycle of the symphonies of Carl Nielsen. Grove's Dictionary of Music and Musicians wrote:

"He conducted a Sibelius cycle in 1992 and a concert performance of Les Troyens the following year, both of which have become the stuff of legend. More recently he has added grand performances of Bruckner, Richard Strauss and Elgar, the première of Tippett's last major work, The Rose Lake (1995), and a Berlioz cycle begun with Benvenuto Cellini in 1999 and crowned by an incandescent Les Troyens in December 2000, all confirming his partnership with the LSO as one of the most important of its time."

== Teacher ==
Davis was president of the Landesgymnasium für Musik "Carl Maria von Weber" in Dresden, and held the International Chair of Orchestral Studies at the Royal Academy of Music, London. Jonathan Freeman-Attwood, principal of the academy, wrote of Davis:

"As the Academy's International Chair of Conducting over 25 years, Sir Colin helmed six opera productions and over sixty concerts, classes and chamber music projects. Such extraordinary generosity from a major international conductor is surely unique. He inspired a whole generation here, as did Henry Wood and John Barbirolli before him."

== Recordings ==
Davis's discography is extensive, numbering over 300 recordings. He made his first record in 1958 conducting the Sinfonia of London in performances of Mozart's Symphonies 29 and 39 for World Record Club (TZ 130). This was followed on 8 May 1959 by a recording made in Kingsway Hall, London, for Decca with the New Symphony Orchestra of London and pianist Peter Katin performing Rachmaninov's Piano Concerto No. 2 in C minor Op. 18. He made several records for the small independent label L'Oiseau Lyre, including a 1960 L'enfance du Christ and a 1962 Béatrice et Bénédict which, at April 2013, were both still available on CD. For EMI he made both operatic and orchestral recordings, the former with Sadler's Wells forces, including excerpts from Carmen and a complete Oedipus rex, and the latter including Harold in Italy with Yehudi Menuhin, and what remains one of his best-known recordings, a 1961 Beethoven Seventh Symphony.

=== Philips and RCA ===
In the 1960s, Davis signed as an exclusive artist for Philips Records, with whom he made an extensive range of recordings in the symphonic repertoire and many operatic recordings, including the major Mozart operas; operas by Tippett, Britten, Verdi and Puccini; and a comprehensive survey of the operas of Berlioz, culminating in an award-winning first recording of the complete Les Troyens issued in May 1970.

Davis's 1966 Philips recording of Handel's Messiah was regarded as revelatory at the time of its issue for its departure from the large-scale Victorian-style performances that had previously been customary. Other Philips recordings included a 1982 set of Haydn's twelve London symphonies with the Royal Concertgebouw Orchestra "distinguished by performances of tremendous style and authority, and a sense of rhythmic impetus that is most exhilarating"; and a 1995 Beethoven symphony cycle with the Dresden Staatskapelle, of which Gramophone wrote, "There has not been a Beethoven cycle like this since Klemperer's heyday."

Davis made a number of records with the Boston Symphony Orchestra for Philips, including the first of his three Sibelius cycles, which remains in the CD catalogues. They also recorded works by Debussy, Grieg, Schubert, Schumann, and Tchaikovsky.

For RCA Victor Red Seal, Davis recorded complete symphony cycles of Sibelius (with the LSO), Brahms (Bavarian Radio Symphony Orchestra, 1989–98), and Schubert (Dresden Staatskapelle, 1996).

=== LSO Live ===
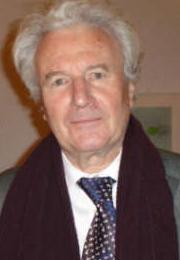
Davis in 2007

Davis's term as principal conductor of the LSO coincided with the orchestra's decision to launch its own record label, LSO Live. Davis' recordings on the LSO Live label include Beethoven's opera Fidelio (2006), a wide range of Berlioz works, including a second recording of Les Troyens (2000), La damnation de Faust (2000), Roméo et Juliette (2000), Béatrice et Bénédict (2000), Harold en Italie (2003), and the Symphonie fantastique (2000); Britten's Peter Grimes (2004); Dvořák's Symphonies Nos. 6–9 (1999–2004); five Elgar sets: the Enigma Variations (2007) and the Introduction and Allegro for Strings (2005), the three symphonies (2001), and The Dream of Gerontius (2005); Handel's Messiah (2006); Haydn's Die Schöpfung (2007); Holst's The Planets (2002); James MacMillan's St John Passion, (2008) The World's Ransoming and The Confession of Isobel Gowdie (2007); Mozart's Requiem (2007); Nielsen's Symphonies Nos. 4–5 (2011); a third Sibelius symphony cycle (2002–2008); Smetana's Má vlast (2005); Tippett's A Child of Our Time (2007), Verdi's Falstaff (2004), Requiem (2009), and Otello (2010); and Walton's First Symphony (2005).

== Awards ==
Davis was appointed CBE in 1965, knighted in 1980 and appointed Member of the Order of the Companions of Honour in 2001. He was awarded the Royal Philharmonic Society's gold medal in 1995, the Queen's Medal for Music, 2009, and has numerous international awards, including Commendatore of the Republic of Italy, 1976; Shakespeare Prize (Germany), 1984; Commander's Cross, Order of Merit (Germany), 1987; Commandeur, l'Ordre des Arts et des Lettres (France), 1990; Commander, Order of the Lion (Finland), 1992; Order of Merit (Bavaria), 1993; Officier, Légion d'honneur (France), 1999 (Chevalier, 1982); Order of Maximilian (Bavaria), 2000.

Other awards include Pipe Smoker of the Year in 1996, Male Artist of the Year in the Classic Brit Awards 2008, the Grammy Award in 2006 for Best Opera for his LSO Live recording of Verdi's Falstaff, and the Elgar Medal in 2012.

He won a total of 10 Grammy Awards and 34 nominations during his career.

== Personal life ==
In 1949, Davis married the soprano April Cantelo. They had two children. Their marriage ended in 1964, and in that same year, Davis married Ashraf Naini, known as Shamsi. To satisfy both the Iranian and British authorities, the couple were married three times, once in Iran and twice in the UK, in the Iranian Embassy in London as well as in a UK civil ceremony; they had five children. One of their children is the conductor Joseph Wolfe, who chose a different surname, because he wanted to "create some space to grow and develop my own identity as a musician".

Shamsi died in June 2010 at the time Davis was conducting Mozart's The Marriage of Figaro at the Royal Opera House. Davis continued the run of performances just days later and when asked, the following year, how he had the strength to perform, he replied:

It comes from the music. There is so much negative nonsense talked about Mozart, but he is – well, he's life itself.

=== Illness and death ===
After his wife's death, Davis's health declined rapidly. He fell from the podium at Covent Garden in February 2011, and cancelled many engagements in the subsequent months. His last concert in France was on 7 June 2012 at the Théâtre des Champs-Elysées in Paris with the Orchestre National de France and Emanuel Ax. His last concert with the LSO was a performance of Berlioz's Grande Messe des morts on 26 June 2012 at Saint Paul's Cathedral in London. His last known performance was with the Haydn Chamber Orchestra, an amateur London orchestra, and soloist Thomas Gould, a month before his death. On 14 April 2013, Davis died in London at the age of 85.

Antonio Pappano, music director at the Royal Opera House, said Davis's death came as a "huge blow". Labour MP Harriet Harman tweeted that Davis had "made a historic contribution to music – in this country & worldwide", while Borjan Canev, former assistant conductor to Davis, said "thank you for being my inspiration".

Cultural offices
| Preceded by Alexander Gibson | Music Director, Sadler's Wells; 1961–1965 | Succeeded by Bryan Balkwill and Mario Bernardi |
| Preceded by Georg Solti | Music Director, Royal Opera House, Covent Garden; 1971–1987 | Succeeded by Bernard Haitink |
