= Tadashi Yanada =

Japanese composer

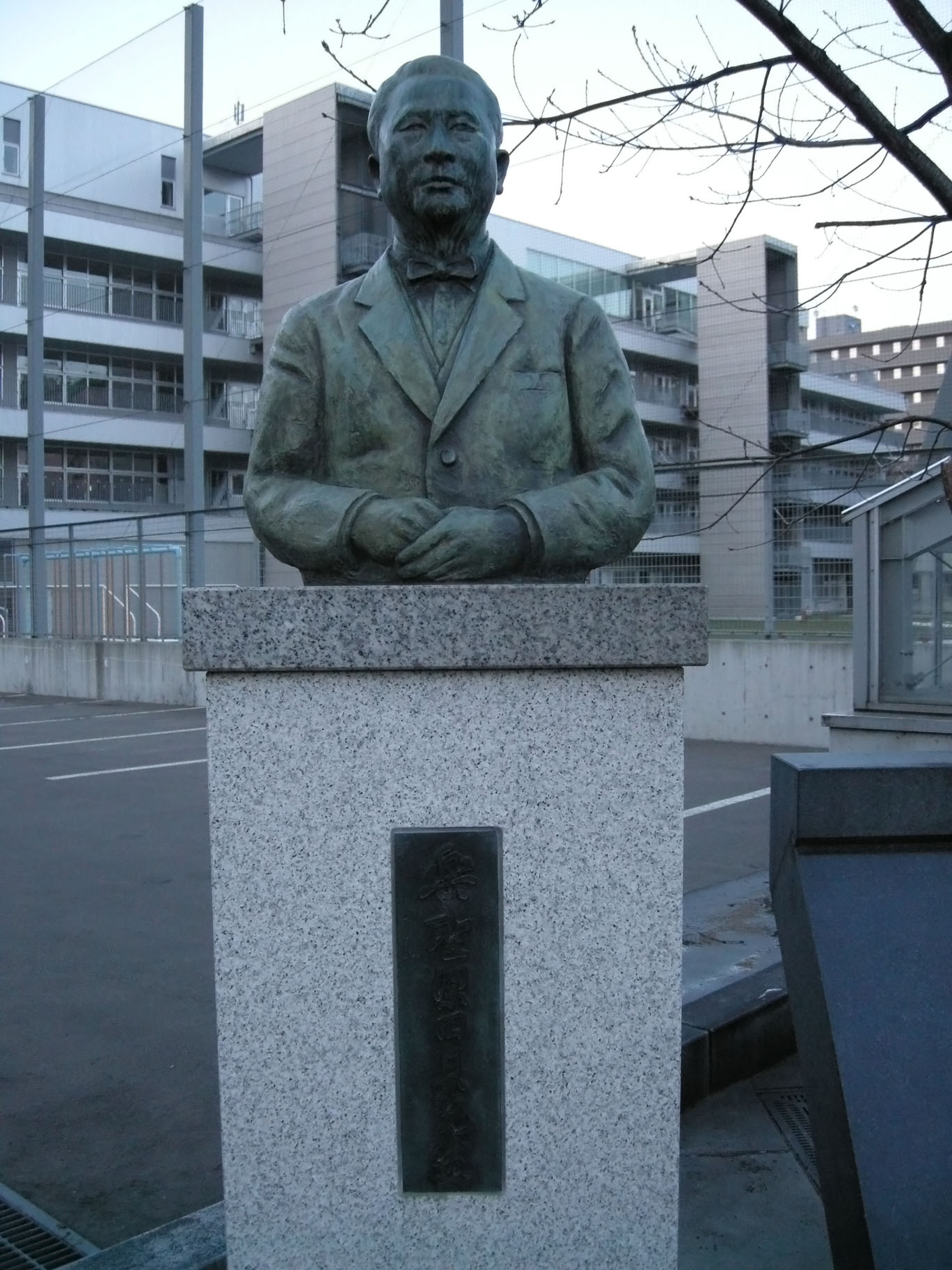
Tadashi Yanada

Tadashi Yanada (梁田貞; 1883–1959) was a Japanese composer. His music was performed at Seijo Elementary School.

== Works, editions and recordings ==
- The Rain of Jogashima ("Jo-ga-shima no ame 城ヶ島の雨"), 1913, for flute and harp.
- A Rolling Acorn (Donguri korokoro), a translation of a nursery rhyme.
