= Kiyoshi Nobutoki =

Japanese composer, teacher and cellist

- 信時 潔
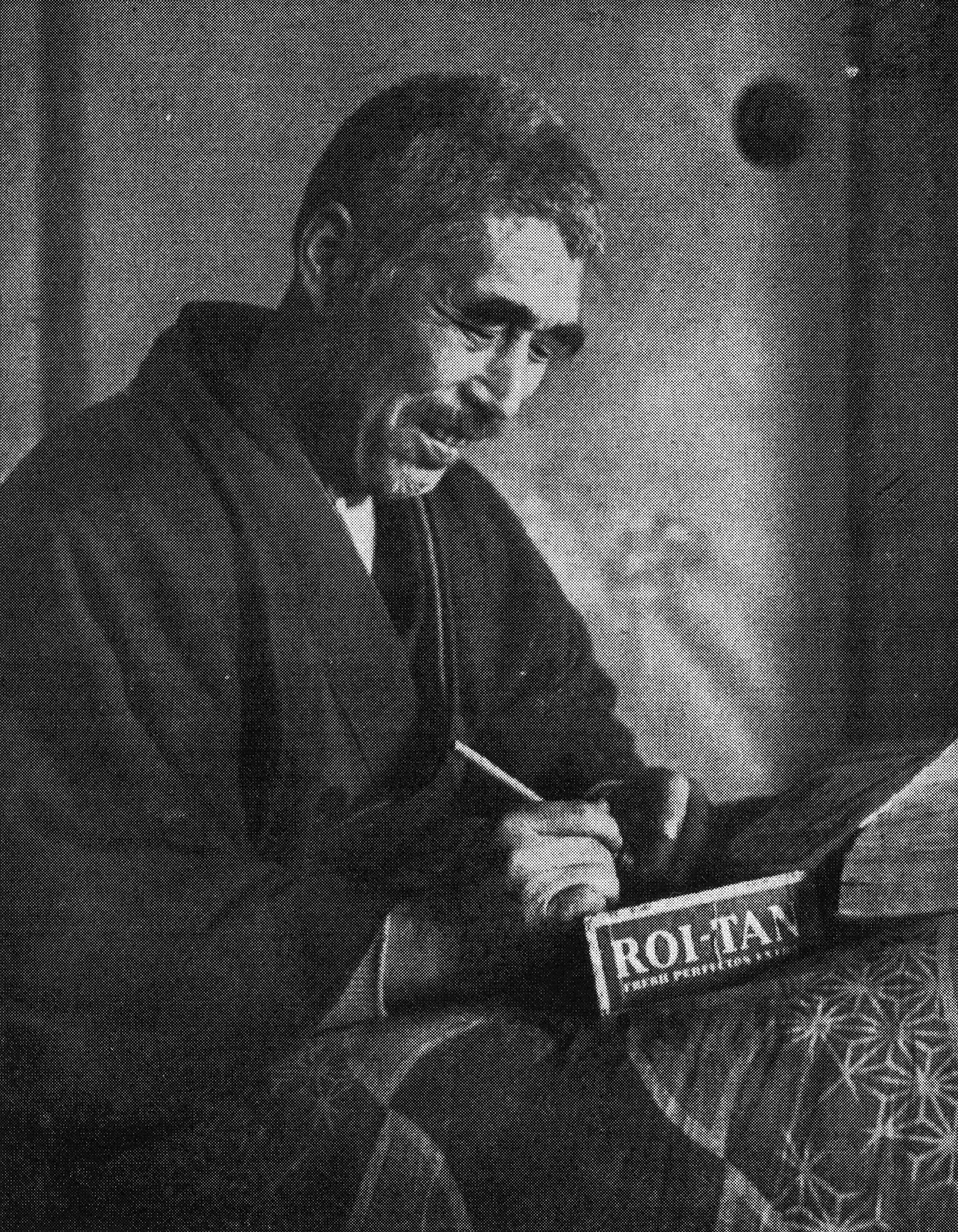
- Kiyoshi Nobutoki (shot in 1949)
- Born: 29 December 1887; Osaka, Japan
- Died: 1 August 1965 (aged 77); Japan
- Occupation: Composer

Kiyoshi Nobutoki (信時 潔, 29 December 1887 – 1 August 1965) was a Japanese composer, teacher and cellist.

== Career ==
His pupils included Kan'ichi Shimofusa, Kunihiko Hashimoto, Saburō Takata, Midori Hosokawa (細川碧), Yoshio Hasegawa (長谷川良夫), Taijiro Goh (呉泰次郎), Megumi Ohnaka (大中恩), and Toshio Kashiwagi (柏木俊夫).

== Works, editions and recordings ==
- "Umi Yukaba" (海行かば) 1937 - patriotic song (gunka) based on a waka poem by Ōtomo no Yakamochi in the Man'yōshū.
- Song cycle Sara (沙羅) - recording by Kazumichi Ohno (tenor), Kyosuke Kobayashi (piano). Thorofon CD. 1994
- String Quartet (1922)
- Cantata "Kaido-tosei (Along the Coast, Conquer the East)", text by Hakushū Kitahara, based on Nihon Shoki (1940)

== Awards and honours ==
Translated from the Japanese Wikipedia article

- Member of the Japan Academy of Art (1942)
- Asahi Prize (1943)
- Person of Cultural Merit (1963)
- Order of the Rising Sun, Gold Rays with Neck Ribbon, Third Class (1964)
