= Yuzo Toyama =

Japanese composer and conductor (1931–2023)

Yūzō Toyama (外山 雄三, Toyama Yūzō; 10 May 1931 – 11 July 2023) was a Japanese composer and conductor. A native of Tokyo, he was a pupil of Kan'ichi Shimofusa; he studied conducting with Kurt Wöss and Wilhelm Loibner and, like them, later became a conductor of the NHK Symphony Orchestra. As a conductor he served with numerous orchestras throughout Japan; as a composer his prime influences are Béla Bartók and Dmitri Shostakovich. Mstislav Rostropovich performed the world premiere of the composer's six-movement 1967 First Cello Concerto, a piece described by Gramophone as "attractive", with the additional comment that it "sounds like Japanese folk music rendered orchestral by Kodaly". His best-known work is a Rhapsody for Orchestra based on Japanese folk songs. Toyama won the Suntory Music Award in 1982.

Toyama died on 11 July 2023, at the age of 92.
