= Atsutada Otaka =

Japanese composer and musicologist (1944–2021)

- Born: 10 March 1944; Tokyo, Japan
- Died: 16 February 2021 (aged 76)
- Occupations: composer and musicologist
- Relatives: father: Hisatada Otaka (composer) brother: Tadaaki Otaka (conductor) great-grandfather: Eiichi Shibusawa (businessman)

Atsutada Otaka (尾高 惇忠; 10 March 1944 – 16 February 2021) was a Japanese composer and musicologist. He studied at the Tokyo University of the Arts with Tomojirō Ikenouchi, Akio Yashiro, and Akira Miyoshi. After studying in Paris, he became a professor at the Tokyo University of the Arts. He has written works for various genres. Some of his works have been recorded on CD and are also known in countries outside of Japan.

Otaka died on 16 February 2021, aged 76 years.

== Major works ==
- Image for orchestra (1981)
- Rhapsody for piano (1983, revised 2006)
- String Quartet (1986)
- Ballade pour piano (1991)
- Portrait for orchestra (1993)
- Fantasy for organ and orchestra (1999)
- Symphony, "Au-delà du temps" (2011)
- de la MER musicale: 12 pieces pour piano (2016)
- Piano Concerto (2016)
- Cello Concerto (2018)
