= Osaka Philharmonic Orchestra =

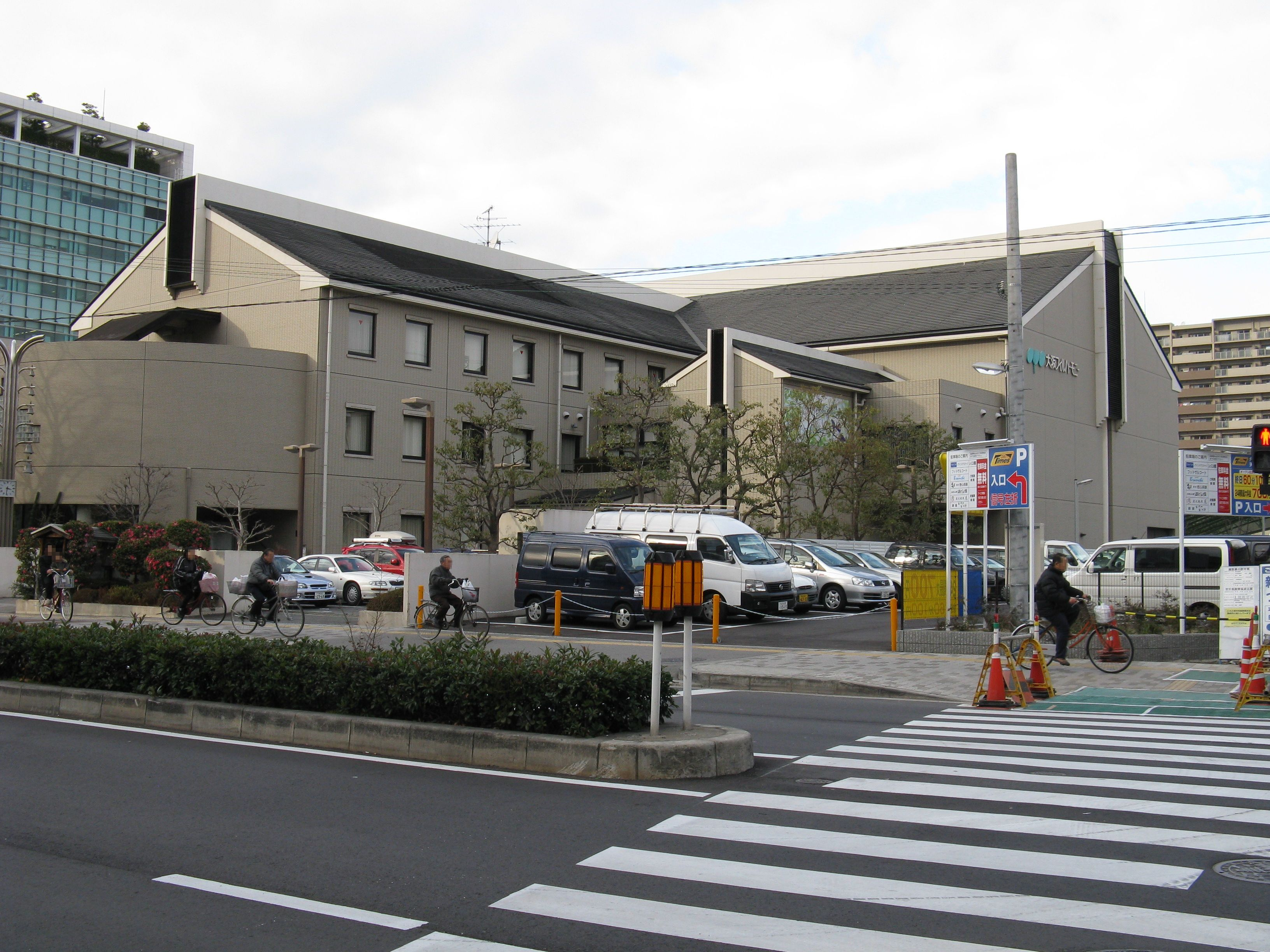
Osaka Philharmonic Hall

The Osaka Philharmonic Orchestra (大阪フィルハーモニー交響楽団, Ōsaka Firuhāmonī Kōkyō Gakudan) is a Japanese symphony orchestra based in Osaka, Japan. Founded in 1947 as the Kansai Symphony Orchestra, the orchestra took the name of the Osaka Philharmonic Orchestra in 1960, and in 2014, formally assumed the official name of the Osaka Philharmonic Association. Its primary concert venue is the Osaka Festival Hall.

Takashi Asahina was the orchestra's founder and served as its music director and principal conductor until 2001. Eiji Oue became the orchestra's second music director, and served from 2003 to 2014. He now has the title of conductor laureate with the orchestra. Since April 2018, Tadaaki Otaka is the orchestra's music director.

== Music directors ==
- Takashi Asahina (1947–2001)
- Eiji Oue (2003–2014)
- Michiyoshi Inoue (2014–2017, principal conductor)
- Tadaaki Otaka (2018– )
