= Minao Shibata =

Japanese composer (1916–1996)

- 柴田 南雄
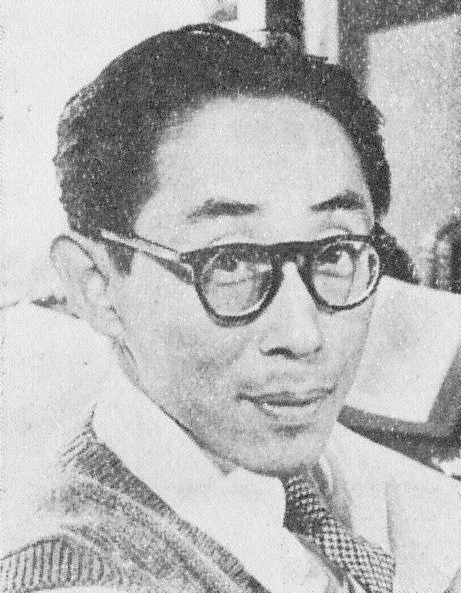
- Born: September 29, 1916; Tokyo
- Died: February 2, 1996 (aged 79); Tokyo
- Occupation: composer

Minao Shibata (柴田 南雄, Shibata Minao); September 29, 1916, Tokyo – February 2, 1996, Tokyo) was a Japanese composer.

== Early life ==
Minao studied botany at Tokyo University, graduating in 1939, and made further studies in the fine arts while studying music privately with Saburo Moroi and playing cello as a member of the Tokyo String Orchestra. His early works are mostly for chamber groups and are indebted to Romanticism.

== Academic career ==
In 1948, he took a position as a professor of theory at Tōhō Gakuen School of Music, working there through 1955; he also taught at Ochanomizu Women's College in 1952, remaining there until 1959. He began incorporating elements of serialism and musique concrete in the 1950s, and wrote for increasingly larger orchestral forces.

Shibata accepted a professorship at Tokyo University of the Arts in 1959, where he remained until 1969, and while there his compositions incorporated aspects of aleatory music. He wrote pieces which used graphic or artistic scoring notations and made use of microtonal sonorities.

== Post academic career ==
From 1973 he composed theater works which combined elements of Japanese folk music with European-derived song structures. In his final years, he composed La Vía Láctea, a choral work for children's choir that adapted his methodology of focusing on regional Japanese culture to a region abroad.

Shibata also wrote extensively on music history and theory, and was an editor of The New Grove's Japanese edition.
