= Isao Matsushita =

Japanese business executive

Isao Matsushita is the president of JX Holdings, a Japanese petroleum and metals conglomerate, and a Fortune Global 500 company.

Matsushita has been president of JX since June 2012.

== Early life ==
Matsushita was born on 3 April 1947 in Yoshida, Shizuoka.
