= Kan'ichi Shimofusa =

Japanese composer (1898–1962)

Kanichi Shimofusa
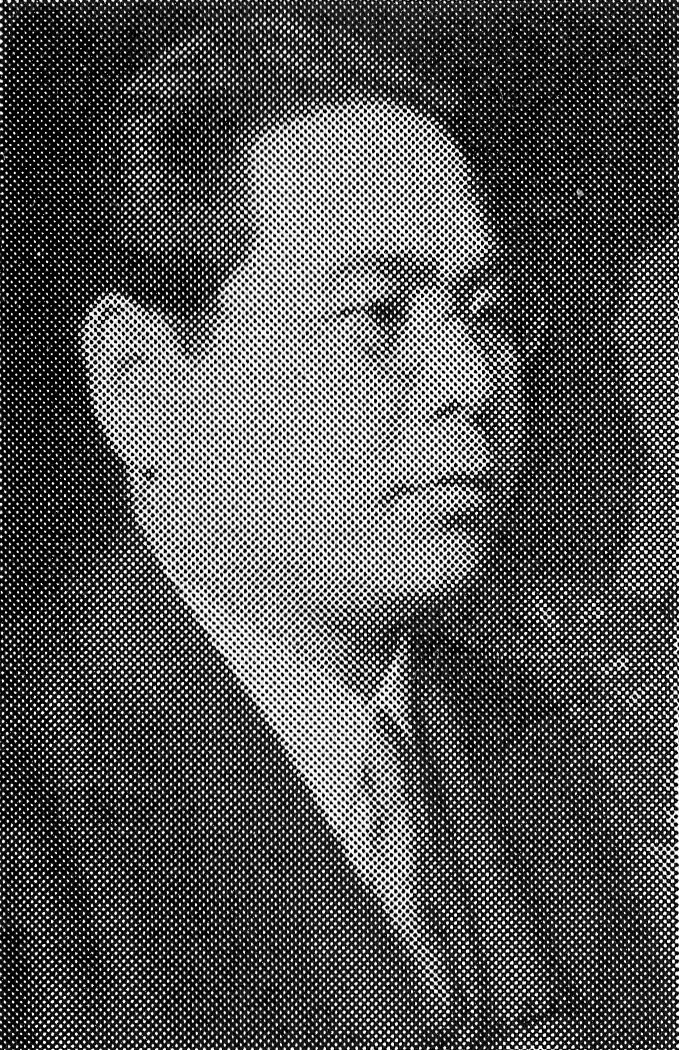
- Shimofusa in 1934
- Born: March 31, 1898; Saitama
- Died: July 8, 1962 (aged 64)
- Education: Tokyo Music School; Berlin University of the Arts
- Occupation: composer
- Employer: Tokyo National University of Fine Arts and Music

Kanichi Shimofusa (Japanese: 下総皖一; March 31, 1898 - July 8, 1962) was a Japanese composer.

Kanichi Shimofusa was born in Sunahara, Haramichi-mura, Saitama (now Ōtone, Saitama). He studied composition with Kiyoshi Nobutoki at Tokyo Music School (now Tokyo National University of Fine Arts and Music, also called Geidai), where he graduated first on the list in 1920. Later, he studied with Paul Hindemith at Berlin University of the Arts in Germany, making him the forerunner of Brahms-Hindemith-descended German style at Tokyo Music School. His notable students at Tokyo Music School include Ikuma Dan, Makoto Sato, Yasushi Akutagawa, Mareo Ishiketa, Yuzo Toyama and Taminosuke Matsumoto; his private students included Kunio Suda.

Kanichi Shimofusa composed numerous nursery rhymes and government-approved music for music textbooks. He also composed a number of school songs for elementary, junior high, and high schools. The total number of his composition went over 1,000. His music style was unostentatious and steady.

He became an associate professor at Tokyo Music School in 1934. He became a member of the textbook editorial committee of the Ministry of Education, Science, Sports and Culture in 1940. He became a professor at Tokyo Music School in 1942 and the dean of the Department of Music at Tokyo National University of Fine Arts and Music in 1956.

== Notable works ==
=== Orchestral works ===
- Shamisen Concerto (1935)
- Koto Concerto (1939)
- Variations for orchestra

=== Chamber and instrumental ===
- Theme and Variations for string trio (1933)
- Sonata for solo koto (1941)
- Passacaglia and Dance for piano (1941)
- Trio for flute, cello, and koto
- Suite for accordion and koto
- Suite for clarinet and koto
- Three pieces for clarinet and piano
- Little Suite for two flutes

=== Nursery rhymes ===
- Nogiku (lyric by Nobuo Ishimori)
- Hanabi (lyric by Takeshi Inoue)
- Skii (lyric by unknown writer)
- Hotaru (lyric by Takeshi Inoue)
- Nagai Michi (lyric by Ryuha Hayashi)
- Haha no Uta (lyric by Nogami Yaeko)
- Kakurenbo (lyric by Ryuha Hayashi)
- Usagi no Dansu (lyric by Ujo Noguchi)
- Gojuon no Uta (lyric by Hakushu Kitahara)
- Tanabatasama (lyric by Hanayo Gondo and Ryuha Hayashi)
- Kokka Keiyo no Uta (unknown lyric writer)
- Yuyake Koyake (Government-approved song, undisclosed lyric writer)
