= Kikuko Masumoto =

Japanese musician (born 1937)

Kikuko Masumot
- Born: 2 February 1937 (age 89); Japan Tokyo
- Other name: 増本 伎共子
- Occupation: composer
- Website: website

Kikuko Masumoto (増本 伎共子, Masumoto Kikuko; born 2 February 1937) is a Japanese pianist, music educator, composer, and ethnomusicologist.

== Biography ==
She was born in Japan and studied music at the Toho Gakuen School of Music and the University of Tokyo. After completing her education, she took a position teaching music at Toho Gakuen.

== Works ==
Masumoto composes music for chamber ensemble, opera and voice performance. Selected compositions include:

- Pastorale for solo recorder
- Archaic Phrase for solo Chang harp
- Tapestry for solo harpsichord
- Ranjoh for solo flute
