= Tadaaki Otaka =

Japanese conductor (born 1947)

Tadaaki Otaka CBE
- 尾高 忠明
- Born: November 8, 1947 (age 78); Kamakura, Japan
- Occupation: conductor
- Relatives: father: Hisatada Otaka (composer) brother: Atsutada Otaka (composer) great-grandfather: Eiichi Shibusawa (businessman)

Tadaaki Otaka, (尾高 忠明, Otaka Tadaaki; born November 8, 1947) is a Japanese conductor.

== Biography ==
Otaka was born in Kamakura, Japan on November 8, 1947.

He studied composition, theory, and French horn, at the Toho Gakuen School of Music in Chōfu. He was subsequently a conducting student of Hideo Saito.

Otaka has served as conductor of the Tokyo Philharmonic Orchestra and became conductor laureate since 1991. From 1981 to 1986, he was chief conductor of the Sapporo Symphony Orchestra, and since May 1998 held the titles of music adviser and principal conductor. From 1992 to 1998, he was principal conductor of the Yomiuri Nippon Symphony Orchestra. He founded the Kioi Sinfonietta Tokyo in 1995, and has served as its music adviser, principal conductor, and honorary conductor laureate.

In the UK, Otaka was principal conductor of the BBC National Orchestra of Wales (BBC NOW) from 1987 to 1995. Otaka now has the title of conductor laureate with the BBC NOW. From 1998 to 2001, he directed the Britten-Pears Orchestra. In 2012, Otaka was named international president of the Welsh Sinfonia.

In September 2009, Otaka was appointed principal guest conductor of the Melbourne Symphony Orchestra (MSO), effective as of 2010. After the sudden departure of MSO's chief conductor Oleg Caetani in October 2009, Otaka's role was accelerated for him to assume the post in late 2009.

In May 2017, Otaka was appointed Artistic Advisor of the Sapporo Community Plaza. Otaka is currently Music Director of the Osaka Philharmonic Orchestra from April 2018. He took 2 months of medical leave from the orchestra in 2019.

== Awards ==
Otaka was the recipient of the 23rd Suntory Music Award in 1991. He received an Honorary Fellowship from the Royal Welsh College of Music & Drama in 1993, he also holds an Honorary Doctorate from the University of Wales. He was appointed an honorary Commander of the Order of the British Empire in 2010.

In 2000, Otaka became the first Japanese person to be awarded the Elgar Medal.

In 2026, he was honored as a Person of Cultural Merit.

Cultural offices
Preceded by Erich Bergel	Principal Conductor, BBC National Orchestra of Wales; 1987–1995	Succeeded by Mark Wigglesworth
Preceded by Heinz Rögner	Principal Conductor, Yomiuri Nippon Symphony Orchestra; 1992–1998	Succeeded by Gerd Albrecht
Preceded by Hiroshi Wakasugi	Opera Artistic Director, New National Theatre Tokyo; 2010–2014	Succeeded by Taijiro Iimori
Preceded by Michiyoshi Inoue (principal conductor)	Principal Conductor, Osaka Philharmonic Orchestra; 2018–present	Succeeded by incumbent
