= Two Little Pieces (Yoshimatsu) =

Two Little Pieces is a series two small pieces for solo classical guitar, composed by Takashi Yoshimatsu in 1994. It was written as a subset of pieces that the composer wrote for classical guitarist Kazuhito Yamashita, originally composed for the piano or harp. The composer describes the work as an "envocation of a lonely fish and a white view".

The sheet music for these pieces was issued together in Yoshimatsu Collected Works Vol. 2 for Guitar.

== List set of Two Little Pieces ==
Both pieces are in written in 2/4 timing and played in standard tuning.

1. Canticle – A canticle written in the key of G major and the tempo is indicated as adagio
2. Noël – A piece written in the key of E major and the tempo is indicated as largo

== Recordings ==
- Wind Colour Vector: Yamashita Plays Yoshimatsu performed by Kazuhito Yamashita.
- Meditations – Works for Guitar performed by Craig Ogden.
