= Compositions for Guitar by Takashi Yoshimatsu =

This is a list of compositions by Takashi Yoshimatsu for guitar.

== Litmus Distance Op. 10 (1980) ==
"Litmus Distance" is a series of two small pieces for classical guitar, composed by Takashi Yoshimatsu. One of the composer's debut works, he describes it as a new kind of imagined folk music, portraying of the distance of the bedouins.

The sheet music for these pieces was issued together in Yoshimatsu: Guitar Works Vol. 2: Wind color Vector.

=== List set of Litmus Distance ===
The first piece is played with the low E string tuned down a full step (drop D tuning). The second piece has the low E string (6th string) tuned down a full step and a half to C♯, and both the A string (5th string) and D string (4th string) are tuned down half a step to give G♯ and C♯. The player is instructed to hang a bell on the tuning peg which is used throughout the piece alongside other percussion effects including tambour and Bartok pizzicato. Both pieces are played in free time.

1. Bedouin in Acid
2. Bedouin in Alkali

=== Recordings ===
- Wind Colour Vector: Yamashita Plays Yoshimatsu performed by Kazuhito Yamashita.

== Tender Toys (1983–4) ==
Tender Toys for Guitar is a series of eighteen pieces (eleven solo pieces and seven duets) for classical guitar, composed by Takashi Yoshimatsu. They were first featured alongside his contributions to the Japanese guitar magazine Gendai Gita (Modern Guitar) between 1983 and 1984.

Takashi describes the work as consisting of tender romances, renaissance-style melodies, jazz-like dance music, marches in the manner of synthpop, distorted dances in the idiom of contemporary music and nostalgic waltzes. Most of the pieces were composed specifically for his magazine contributions but pieces such as Aubade, Arioso in Blue, Music Box of Mr. Arnold and Portrait of Miss. L are based on piano pieces that he composed between 1970 and 1975, during his years as a student. He describes Rimse as a parody of an Ainu dance with the same title and also of Satie's Gymnopédies. Portrait of Mr. G was influenced by the aria from the Goldberg Variations and was composed after the composer learnt of the death of Glenn Gould, Angels in Twilight is a part of an aria which was used in a theatrical work and Velvet Waltz was originally used in a radio drama.

The sheet music specifies two guitars however, several of the duets can be performed by flute and guitar and versions have been transcribed for harmonica for five of the pieces, namely Aubade, Arioso in Blue, Rimse, Portrait of Miss. L and Velvet Waltz, although the composer states that these pieces can be played in any order with any instrument to supplement the guitar.

The sheet music for these pieces was issued together in Yoshimatsu Takashi Guitar Works Vol. 1: Tender Toys for Guitar Solo.

=== List set of Tender Toys for Guitar ===
All pieces are played in standard tuning with the exception of Antique Tree Song and March to the Distorted Flags (2nd guitar only), which are played with the low E string tuned down one full step (drop D tuning).

- Romance for Tree
- Antique Tree Song
- Street Dancer
- Portrait of Mr. G
- Rain Song of a Jester
- Rimse
- Angels in Twilight
- Vignette
- Interceptor
- Nocturn
- Arabesque in the Rain
- Afternoon at the Penguin Park
- Aubade
- Arioso in Blue
- March to the Distorted Flags
- Music Box of Mr. Arnold
- Portrait of Miss. L
- Velvet Waltz

=== Recordings ===
- Nagatsuka & Nakane: Tender Toys performed by Takashi Nagatsuka & Arthur Nakane
- Yoshimatsu: Guitar Works "Tender Toys" performed by Shin-ichi Fukuda
- Yoshimatsu: Pleiadas Dance 2 performed by Kyoko Tabe
- Forgetful Angel performed by Joe Sakimoto.

== Wind Color Vector (1991) ==
Wind Color Vector, Op. 48 is a series of three small pieces for solo classical guitar, composed by Takashi Yoshimatsu in 1991. It was written as a subset of pieces from a set of three pieces that the composer wrote for classical guitarist Kazuhito Yamashita entitled Wind, Water, Sky and bearing the titles Wind Color Vector, Water Color Scalar and Sky Color Tensor.

The sheet music for these pieces was issued together in Yoshimatsu : Guitar Works Vol. 2 : Wind color Vector.

=== List set of Wind Color Vector ===
The first and third movements are composed in free time with no key signature specified. The second movement is in written in 3/8 timing, in the key of G major.

1. Leeward
2. Calm
3. Windward

=== Recordings ===
- Wind Colour Vector: Yamashita Plays Yoshimatsu performed by Kazuhito Yamashita.
- Craig Ogden: Guitar Meditations performed by Craig Ogden.
- A Gift – Guitar Music of Leo Brouwer, John, Tavener Takashi Yoshimatsu and Mark-Anthony Turnage performed by Gerard Cousins.

== Sky Color Tensor Op. 52 (1992) ==
Guitar Sonata "Sky color Tensor is a series of five movements in a symphonic work for solo classical guitar, composed by Takashi Yoshimatsu in 1992. It was written as a subset of pieces from a set of three pieces that the composer wrote for classical guitarist Kazuhito Yamashita entitled Wind, Water, Sky and bearing the titles Wind Color Vector, Water Color Scalar and Sky Color Tensor.

The sheet music for these pieces was issued together in Yoshimatsu Collected Works Vol. 2 for Guitar.

=== List set of Sky Color Tensor ===
All pieces are composed in free time and no key signature is specified. The first four movements are played in standard tuning, although due to the number of low notes, the last movement is notated with an additional bass clef. The third movement involves unusual techniques such as plucking the strings between the nut and left finger and plucking the strings between the nut and pegs.

1. Noon
2. Twilight
3. Night
4. Midnight
5. Rondo

=== Recordings ===
- Wind Colour Vector: Yamashita Plays Yoshimatsu performed by Kazuhito Yamashita.

== Water Color Scalar (1993) ==
Water Color Scalar, Op. 57 is a series of five small dances for solo classical guitar, composed by Takashi Yoshimatsu in 1993. It was written as a subset of pieces from a set of three pieces that the composer wrote for classical guitarist Kazuhito Yamashita entitled Wind, Water, Sky and bearing the titles Wind Color Vector, Water Color Scalar and Sky Color Tensor.

Yoshimatsu describes the pieces as written in a pseudo-classical style in which the linear guitar rhythms imitate a water-colored scalar. The score is written using only quavers and semi-quavers and features complicated rhythms and passages which make it difficult for the guitarist to perform.

The sheet music for these pieces was issued together in Yoshimatsu Collected Works Vol. 2 for Guitar.

=== List set of Water Color Scalar ===
All pieces are played in standard tuning with the exception of Prelude which has the low E string tuned down a full step (drop D tuning) and Intermezzo B makes use of the tambour technique.

1. Prelude
2. Intermezzo A
3. Dance
4. Intermezzo B
5. Rondo

=== Recordings ===
All pieces were recorded on the album Yoshimatsu: Guitar Works "Tender Toys" and performed by classical guitarist Shin-Ichi Fukuda.

Water Color Scalor was also recorded by Japanese classical guitarist Kaori Muraji on her album "Lumieres".

== 2 Little Pieces (1994) ==
2 Little Pieces is a series two small pieces for solo classical guitar, composed by Takashi Yoshimatsu in 1994. It was written as a subset of pieces that the composer wrote for classical guitarist Kazuhito Yamashita, originally composed for the piano or harp. The composer describes the work as an "envocation of a lonely fish and a white view".

The sheet music for these pieces was issued together in Yoshimatsu Collected Works Vol. 2 for Guitar.

=== List set of Two Little Pieces ===
Both pieces are in written in 2/4 timing and played in standard tuning.

1. Canticle
2. Noël

==== Recordings ====
- Wind Colour Vector: Yamashita Plays Yoshimatsu performed by Kazuhito Yamashita.
- Craig Ogden: Guitar Meditations performed by Craig Ogden.

== 4 Little Dream Songs (1997) ==
4 Little Dream Songs is a series of 4 pieces for solo classical guitar, composed by Takashi Yoshimatsu in 1993. It was written as a supplement to the composer's Tender Toys works and consists of transcriptions for guitar and harmonica of various melodies which were used in broadcasts and stage plays.

The sheet music for these pieces was issued together in Yoshimatsu Collected Works Vol. 3 for Guitar.

=== List set of 4 Little Dream Songs ===
All four pieces are played in standard tuning.

- Spring: Dream Song in May
- Summer: Crooked Waltz in August
- Autumn: Dream Song in November
- Winter: Lullaby (I hope the world is here tomorrow too...)

=== Recordings ===
- Yoshimatsu: Guitar Works "Tender Toys" performed by Shin-Ichi Fukuda.

== Around the Round Ground Op. 66 (1997) ==
Around the Round Ground is a series of two small pieces for solo classical guitar, composed by Takashi Yoshimatsu in 1997. It was written as a successor to the trilogy Wind, Water and Sky.

=== List set of Around the Round Ground ===
Both pieces are performed with the low E string is tuned to D (drop D tuning) in the key of A minor. The second part is accompanied by wind chimes and bells.

1. Ostinato
2. Canticle

=== Recordings ===
Both pieces were recorded on the album Yoshimatsu: Guitar Works "Tender Toys" and performed by classical guitarist Shin-Ichi Fukuda.

== Atom Hearts Club Duo Op. 70a (1997) ==
This piece was originally composed in the Summer of 1997 as a string quartet for Morgaua Quartet. The following year, a guitar duo project of Shin-ichi Fukuda and Eduardo Fernández was formed and Fukuda asked if the piece could be arranged for two guitars.

The title "Atom Hearts Club" (or the full title "Dr. Tarkus's Atom Hearts Club Duo"), is a parody of the Beatle's Sgt. Pepper's Lonely Heart's Club Band. Additional albums that influenced the composition were Emerson, Lake & Palmer's Tarkus, Pink Floyd's Atom Heart Mother, and Yes's Fragile. Osamu Tezuka's Astro Boy also served as inspiration for the piece.

=== List set of Atom Hearts Club ===
The piece of consists of four movements and the composer describe the movements as follows; the first movement is Allegro in the style of progressive rock with irregular metres. The second is a provocative ballade-like andante. The third is a Scherzo of a lover tip-toeing away from the cheating wife's room. The last is a boogie-woogie slapstick.

1. Allegro
2. Andate
3. Scherzo
4. Finale

All movements are played with the low E string tuned down a full step (drop D tuning). The sheet music was issued together in Yoshimatsu: Atom Hearts Duo for Two Guitars.

=== Recordings ===
The duet was recorded on the album "Atom Hearts Club Duo" and performed by classical guitarists Shin-Ichi Fukuda and Eduardo Fernandez.
