= Chobanian =

Chobanian (in Armenian Չոպանեան or Չոպանյան) is an Armenian surname. It may refer to:

- Aram Chobanian (1929–2023), ninth President of Boston University
- Arshag Chobanian (1872–1954), Armenian short story writer, journalist, editor, poet, translator, literary critic, playwright, philologist, and novelist
- Loris Ohannes Chobanian (born 1933–2023), Iraqi-born Armenian-American composer of classical music, conductor, and guitar and lute teacher and performer

== See also ==
- Chobani (disambiguation)
