= Ann Moss (musician) =

American operatic soprano

- Born: September 9, 1976 (age 50); Concord, Massachusetts
- Genres: Classical, New Music
- Occupations: Opera Singer, Concert Soloist, Recording Artist
- Instrument: Voice
- Years active: 2003–present
- Labels: Albany Records, Angels Share Records, Arsis Audio, Navona Records, Naxos Records, Ravello Records
- Spouse: Justin Ouellet
- Website: www.annmosssoprano.com

Ann Moss is an American operatic soprano. She is best known for her commitment to contemporary music, having premiered and recorded works by many living composers including Vartan Aghababian, Nancy Bachmann, Weslie Brown, David Conte, Kenneth Froelich, Keiko Fujiie, Heather Gilligan, Jake Heggie, Miriam Miller, Miya Masaoka, Kirk O'Riordan, Wayne Peterson, Eric Sawyer, Allen Shearer, Tony Solitro, John Thow and Liam Wade, among others.

== Biography ==
Moss was born in Concord, Massachusetts, and was raised in Lincoln, Massachusetts, in a musical family, studying piano from a young age with her grandmother, Frances Moss. Her grandfather, Leonard G. Moss, was a violinist with the Baltimore Symphony Orchestra, the New York Opera Company, the New York Ballet Theatre, the Dallas Symphony Orchestra, the Cleveland Symphony Orchestra, and retired in 1996 after 43 years with the Boston Symphony Orchestra. Ann Moss received a bachelor's degree with a concentration in Music and the Related Arts at Hampshire College, a master's degree in Vocal Performance at the Longy School of Music of Bard College and a post-graduate degree in Vocal Performance from the San Francisco Conservatory of Music.

Between 2004 and 2020, Moss resided and taught in the San Francisco Bay Area. From 2014 to 2020 she lived in Richmond, CA with her husband, jazz violinist and classical violist Justin Ouellet. Between 2020 and 2022 Moss and Ouellet co-produced the album Lifeline, featuring modern interpretations of music by Hildegard von Bingen recorded remotely with instrumentalists around the United States, while living in a series of home-stays and short-term rentals in California, Massachusetts, Maryland, Florida, Texas and South Carolina.

Moss has released four solo albums: Now I Am (Angels Share Records 2025), Lifeline (Angels Share Records 2022), Currents (Angels Share Records 2013) and Love Life (ASR 2016), the latter two produced and recorded by multi-GRAMMY Award winner Leslie Ann Jones at Skywalker Sound, a Lucasfilm, Ltd. company. These feature premiere recordings of compositions by Jake Heggie, John Thow, Liam Wade and Vartan Aghababian, as well as songs by Joni Mitchell, Bob Dylan, Weslie Brown and Lennon-McCartney, with collaborators from the chamber, new music, and jazz communities including the Hausmann Quartet, cellist Emil Miland, pianists Karen Rosenak, Steven Bailey and Matt Berkeley, flamenco guitarist Jeremías García, and vocal ensemble Chanticleer. She can also be heard on releases from labels including PARMA, Arsis Audio, Naxos Records, Albany Records, Navona Records and Jaded Ibis Productions.

== Notable world premieres ==
- 2025 Illusions I Recall (Matthew Cmiel)
- 2025 All Is Beauty (Sanford Dole)
- 2019 The River-merchant's Wife (Allen Shearer)
- 2018 Gaman: to persevere (Christophe Chagnard)
- 2018 Madrigals for the Seasons (David Conte)
- 2018 Hard Stones (Griffin Candey) and (Lisa DeSiro)
- 2017 Down the deep stair (Jared Redmond)
- 2017 Wilderness Mute (Keiko Fujiie)
- 2016 A Line Becomes a Circle (Miya Masaoka)
- 2016 Finite Differences (Kenneth D. Froelich) and (John Grimmett)
- 2016 Regrets Only (John Grimmett)
- 2015 Erbsensuppenlieder (Vartan Aghababian)
- 2015 As I ride the late night freeways (Matt Schumaker)
- 2015 Full Fathom Five (Liam Wade)
- 2014 things that had no opposites (Sam Nichols) and (Tim Horvath)
- 2012 Nerd Songs (Kenneth D. Froelich)
- 2012 Gertrude & Alice: Scenes from a Shared Life (Sanford Dole) and (Brad Erickson)
- 2011 Three Dickinson Songs (Vartan Aghababian)
- 2010 Mame Loshn (Miriam Miller) and (Sarah Traister Moskovitz)
- 2009 Battlegrounds (Heather Gilligan) and (E. Ethelbert Miller)
- 2007 Freedom and Love (Wayne Peterson)

== Notable United States premieres ==
- 2019 you'll drown, dear (Sivan Eldar)

== Discography ==
- Now I Am (Angels Share Records, 2025)
- What Shall I Sing Today? Nancy Bachmann Art Songs (Angels Share Records, 2024)
- Dreamland: Songs by Garry Eister (Angels Share Records, 2024)
- Wild Swans: Nancy Bachmann Chamber Music (Navona Records, 2023)
- The Distance (single, Angels Share Records, 2023)
- Lifeline (Angels Share Records, 2022)
- Some Women's Voices (Albany Records, 2022)
- Autumn Winds (Ravello Records, 2020)
- Nordwell & Moss: Vartan Aghababian Songs for Voice and Piano (Angels Share Records, 2018)
- Everyone Sang: Vocal Music of David Conte (Arsis, 2018)
- Love Life (Angels Share Records, 2016)
- Don Walker: The Thoughtfulness of Thirst (Albany Records, 2016)
- Nerd Songs (Kenneth D. Froelich, 2015)
- Michael Murray: Precipience (Navona, 2015)
- Currents (Angels Share Records, 2013)
- Music for Between Appear and Disappear (Jaded Ibis Productions, 2013)
- Salir el amor del mundo (Naxos Records, 2010)
