= Félix Ibarrondo =

French composer (born 1943)

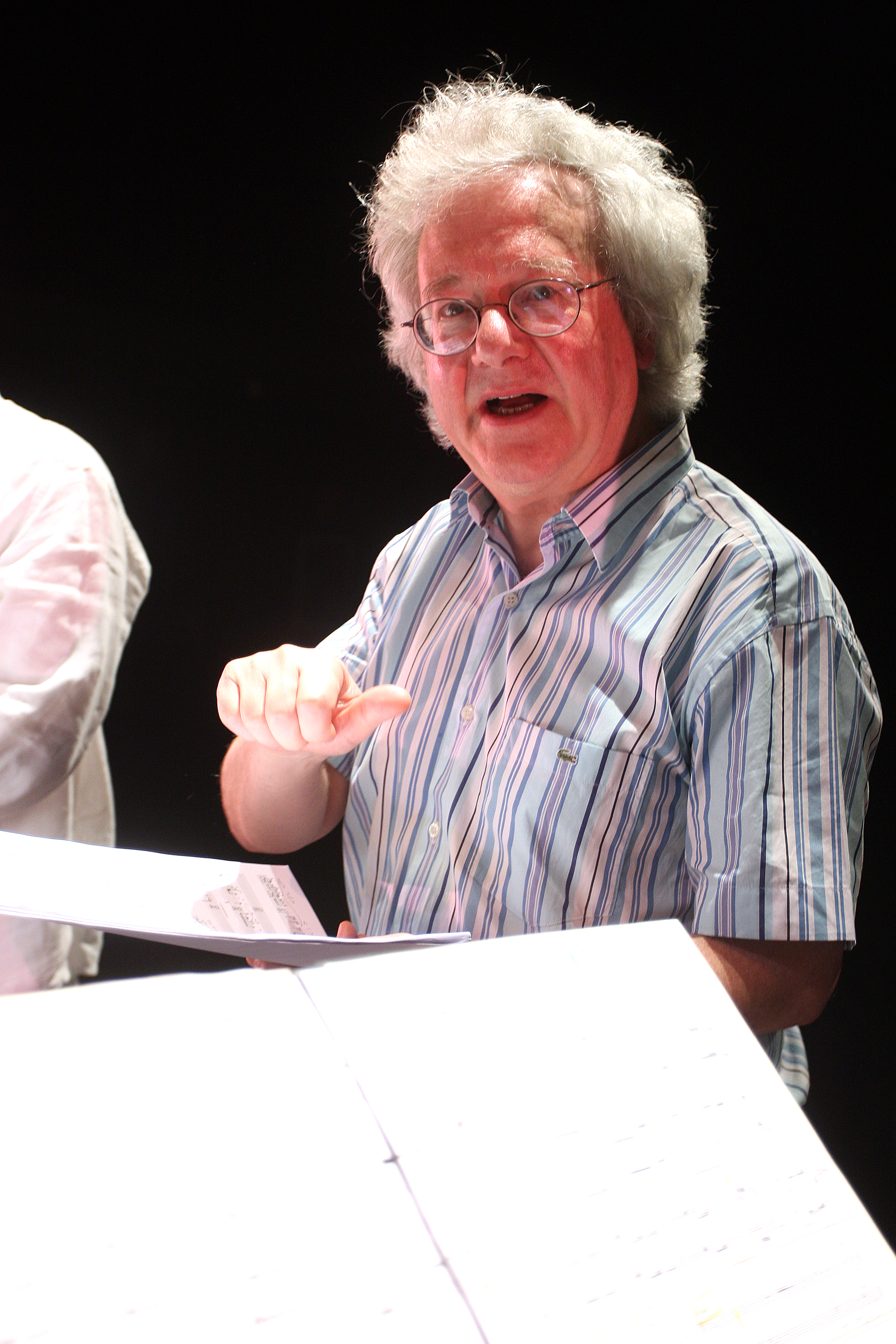
- Félix Ibarrondo in 2011

Background information
- Born: 12 June 1943 (age 82); Oñati, Spain
- Occupation: Composer
- Website: felixibarrondo.com

Félix Ibarrondo (born 12 June 1943) is a French composer of Basque origin.

== Life ==
Ibarrondo was born in Oñati in the Gipuzkoa province of the Basque country in Spain. Coming from a musical family, he learned music theory with his father, Antonino. He then studied music at the San Sebastián and Bilbao conservatories, plus theology and philosophy.

In 1969, he moved to Paris where he studied with Max Deutsch, Henri Dutilleux and Maurice Ohana, the latter having a great influence on his work as a composer. He was also introduced to the electroacoustic music within the Groupe de recherches musicales.

His work spans all vocal and instrumental groupings, from orchestras to small chamber groups.

== Works ==
Chamber music

- Et la vie était là… for string quartet (1973)
- Brisas for 9 instruments (1980)
- Phalène for string trio (1983)

Orchestra

- Vague de fond, for large orchestra (1972)
- Sous l'emprise d'une ombre (1976)
- Izengabekoa (1978)
- Amairuk, for 12 strings and guitar (1979)
- Abyssal for 2 guitars and orchestra (1982)
- Eris for orchestra (1986)
- Irrintz for orchestra (1988)
- Naretzko Aiak, cello concerto (1991)

Vocal

- Aitaren Extea, for tenor, 2 pianos, violin and percussion (1971)
- Musique pour la messe (1977)
- Trois chœurs Basques a capella
  - Odolez (1979)
  - Zoro dantzak (1981)
  - Argiruntz (1983)
- Cibillak, for soprano, tenor, baritone, 2 clarinets and 3 cellos (1981)
- Oroïpen (1993)
- Ode à Martin for choir, soloist and small orchestra (1996)
- Gacela del adiós for soprano and ensemble (1998)
- Illindik (1999)
- Min dira (2004)
- Urrundik (2005)

== Discography ==
- Vocal works – Kaoli Isshiki (soprano), Pablo Márquez (guitar), Musicatreize, Chœur Contemporain, Roland Hayrabedian (2006, L'Empreinte digitale ED 13236) OCLC 162296463
- Piano works - Alfonso Gómez (piano) (2010, Sinkro Records)

== Bibliography ==
- Vignal, Marc (2005). Dictionnaire de la musique (in French). Paris: Éditions Larousse. p. 483. ISBN 2-03-505545-8. OCLC 896013420.
