= Labor Day (soundtrack) =

Labor Day (Original Motion Picture Soundtrack)

Soundtrack album by Rolfe Kent and various artists
- Released: December 17, 2013
- Recorded: Various times
- Studio: Eastwood Scoring Stage, Warner Bros.; Conway Recording Studios; EastWest Studios
- Genre: Soundtrack
- Length: 43:59
- Label: Warner Bros.
- Producer: Rolfe Kent

Rolfe Kent chronology
The Scapegoat (2012)	Labor Day (2013)	Bad Words (2014)

Labor Day (Original Motion Picture Soundtrack) is the soundtrack to the 2013 film of the same name directed by Jason Reitman. The film's original score is composed by Rolfe Kent who previously composed for Reitman's Thank You for Smoking (2005), Up in the Air (2009) and Young Adult (2011). The score album was released by Warner Bros. Records on December 17, 2013, digitally followed by a CD release on January 28, 2014.

The musical score also accompanies the guitar pieces by Andrés Segovia and Shin-Ichi Fukuda, in addition to the songs "I'm Going Home" from Arlo Guthrie's studio album Alice's Restaurant (1967) and Here Before" from Vashti Bunyan's Lookaftering (2005). "Wings" from Birdy and "Take Us Alive" from Other Lives were featured in the promotional trailers. The music received positive response from critics.

== Development ==
In June 2012, Kent was recruited to score music for Labor Day, who described it as an "extremely intense drama". At the 2013 Toronto International Film Festival, Kent, who attended the special screening of the film, was interviewed by Trever Hogg, who described the scoring experience as "The moment I started giving things away or feeding an emotional response Jason would pull me up and guide me back to a position of balance. It's an extraordinary thing to be put through. It's an interesting question to deal with. What it does do is draw attention and intensity to the moment." Reitman suggested few films for Kent to watch, who admitted that he did not copy them in any way, but insisted on how slow the music would be and should not feed the audience in any way.

Jason had several ideas for classical guitar into the beginning, and sustained moods which found their ways into the film. The classical guitar conjured with interesting and organic ways to work on the "music that moves very softly and subtly, with organic flow and nuance, and taking simple acoustic sounds and then processing them through long and warping reverbs was my way of achieving this, in conjunction afterwards with more composed elements such as minimal strings and other interwoven elements". Kent recalled that, "there was a moment where we were talking about certain scenes with the idea that there'd be crickets in the background" and he experimented with cricket sounds using the keyboard that slowed down cricket choir. Some of the acoustic instruments such as guitar and charango, were incorporated with a number of plucked instruments being processed such a way that create the organic washes, which are carefully structured to flow along with the film.

He initially thought of not having any melodies but there are two strong melodies that appear numerous times throughout the film, against the fact that majority of the score is not melodic. This appreciated him the idea of being extremely spare with melodies, where instead of flooding a film with specific cues all over the place, there are two tunes being used carefully and specifically. The two sequences where the music takes over, includes the pie-baking sequence and the climatic sequence, which are different elements in the film. For the former, it was "really the moment when I began to get a handle on how to voice this film, using both interesting but very slowly shifting textures that I had recorded and layered, as well as string chords fading in and out". The cue for the miscarriage sequence was the last to be written as the piano was set to be the "strong melodic character" challenging Reitman that the music had to be emotionally, for which he played a delicate piece to structure a "simple melody of longing, tenderness, fragility, and heartbreak".

== Reception ==
Film Music Magazine's Daniel Schweiger praised the soundtrack as "most impactful insights to the human condition, while completely surprising with its cinematic, and musical authorships." Kaya Savas of Film Music Media gave the album four and a half star out of five and said that "There is beauty, sadness and uneasiness all tackled with a wonderfully calculated approach." Catherine Shoard from The Guardian reviewed that Kent's score "keeps us guessing as to the genre, then sustains tension once we're on solid ground." Todd McCarthy of The Hollywood Reporter reviewed "the low-keyed underscoring of composer Rolfe Kent, keeps the suspense at a purposeful low boil throughout the early going". Betsy Sharkley of Los Angeles Times commented that "in a year of excellent movie scores, British composer Rolfe Kent contributes another one." Matt Goldberg of Collider wrote "Rolfe Kent's thoughtful score can lull us into near complacency before an ear-piercing note and a heartbeat base". Alonso Duralde of TheWrap called the score as "insistent".

== Track listing ==
No.	Title	Music	Length
1.	"I'm Going Home"	Arlo Guthrie	3:14
2.	"A Stroll"	Rolfe Kent	2:48
3.	"Price Mart"	Rolfe Kent	4:56
4.	"Hunger for Human Touch"	Rolfe Kent	4:15
5.	"Frank the HandyMan"	Rolfe Kent	2:24
6.	"Eating Pie"	Rolfe Kent	1:43
7.	"Here Before"	Vashti Bunyan	2:06
8.	"Exercises in B Minor, Op. 35, No. 22: Allegretto"	Shin-Ichi Fukuda	1:56
9.	"Adele's Miscarriages"	Rolfe Kent	4:42
10.	"Letter to Dad"	Rolfe Kent	5:17
11.	"Frank Is Arrested"	Rolfe Kent	1:27
12.	"Henry Grows Up"	Rolfe Kent	7:31
13.	"Romance de los Pinos"	Andrés Segovia	1:41
Total length:			43:59

== Credits ==
Credits adapted from AllMusic.

- Composer – Rolfe Kent
- Producer – Randall Poster, Rolfe Kent
- Musical assistance – Sterling Powers
- Engineer – Ryan Robinson
- Programming – Alice Wood
- Recording – Tom Hardisty, Greg Townley
- Mixing – Tom Hardisty, Greg Townley, Kyle Biane
- Mastering – Patricia Sullivan
- Music editor – Nick South, Alistair South
- Soundtrack co-ordinator – Jason Richmond
- Executive producer – Jason Reitman
- Technician – Jamie Olvera
- Copyist – B n' B Music Services
- Music preparation – Tony Blondal
- Executive in charge of music – Randy Spendlove
- Marketing – Xavier Ramos

Instruments

- Bass – Ken Wild, Paul Morin, Rick Shaw, Trey Henry, Dave Stone
- Bassoon – Damian Montano
- Cello – Cameron Stone, Tina Soule, Erika Duke-Kirkpatrick, Giovanna Clayton, Rudy Stein, Steve Richards, Suzie Katayama, Vanessa Freebairn-Smith, Armen Ksajikian
- Guitar – George Doering
- Harp – Amy Wilkins, Gayle Levant
- Oboe – Jonathan Davis
- Piano – Tom Ranier
- Viola – Alma Fernandez, Carolyn Riley, Darrin McCann, Gina Coletti, Jessica Van Velzen, John Hayhurst, Luke Maurer, Maria Newman, Pam Jacobson, Renita Koven, Scott Hosfeld, Andrew Duckles
- Violin – Armen Annasian, Barbara Porter, Berj Garabedian, Cameron Patrick, Carolyn Osborn, Darius Campo, David Ewart, Erika Walczak, Haim Shtrum, Jay Rosen, Jen Fischer, Joel Derouin, John Wittenberg, Julie Rogers, Kathleen Robertson, Lily Ho Chen, Lisa Dondlinger, Maia Jasper, Mario De Leon, Mark Robertson, Michele Richards, Norm Hughes, Pam Gates, Becky Bunnell, Sam Fischer, Sara Parkins, Sharon Jackson, Songa Lee, Tiffany Hu, Peter Kent

Orchestra

- Conductor – Rolfe Kent
- Orchestration – Richard Bronskill, Tony Blondal
- Contractor – Dan Savant
- Stage manager – Richard Wheeler Jr.
- Concertmaster – Sid Page
