= Max Deutsch =

Austrian-French composer (1892–1982)

- Born: 17 November 1892; Vienna, Austria-Hungary
- Died: 22 November 1982 (aged 90); Paris, France
- Occupations: Classical composer; Conductor; Academic teacher
- Organizations: Sorbonne; École Normale de Musique de Paris

Max Deutsch (17 November 1892 – 22 November 1982) was an Austrian-French composer, conductor, and academic teacher. He studied with Arnold Schoenberg and was his assistant. Teaching at the Sorbonne and the École Normale de Musique de Paris, he influenced notable students such as Philippe Capdenat, Donald Harris, György Kurtág, Philippe Manoury, and Jeannine Richer.

== Career ==
Born in Vienna, Deutsch was a pupil of and assistant to Arnold Schoenberg. He studied under him in Vienna before the First World War, and followed Schoenberg as his assistant to Amsterdam in 1921. Deutsch was a fellow and taught at UNESCO and at the Sorbonne (Paris IV) from 1970 to 1971, and finally, from 1972 to the École Normale de Musique de Paris.

He founded in Paris the theatre Der Jüdische Spiegel (The Jewish Mirror), where many works of composers such as Schönberg, Anton Webern and Alban Berg were first performed.

Konstantin Stanislavski commissioned a work which was to become the opera Schach (Chess). His "film symphony" Der Schatz (The Treasure) came from a commission from German film director G. W. Pabst to provide an original musical score for his 1923 film. In structure, Der Schatz was crafted in two formats: a film score and a stand-alone symphonic work. The five-movement symphony survived because the manuscript in the latter form was donated to the Deutsches Filminstitut in 1982, shortly before Deutsch died. A score of years later, DeutschlandRadio Berlin collaborated with the Staatsphilharmonie Rheinland-Pfalz, conducted by Frank Strobel, to produce a record of "this extremely rare and totally unknown symphonic work". The recording became the foundation of a "synchronized restoration" of the film. As film music the "piece is scored for a theater orchestra of the kind typically found in European cinemas of the day". It brings to mind the work of Kurt Weill and Stefan Wolpe, and foreshadows Max Steiner's modernist film scores, adopting expressionist atonal twelve-tone leitmotifs. Mood setting and character are developed; pianos appear throughout.

From 1940 to 1945, Deutsch served in the French Foreign Legion. He formed long lasting friendships with Georges Bernanos and Jean Cassou. He was close to Tristan Tzara, Jean Cocteau and Vladimir Jankélévitch. Max Deutsch was a friend of Ferruccio Busoni. He died in Paris.

After the Second World War, he devoted himself mainly to teaching music, chiefly following the principles of Schönberg. In Paris, among his hundreds of students, there were composers: Jorge Arriagada, Girolamo Arrigo, Colette Bailly, Sylvano Bussotti, Philippe Capdenat, Gérard Condé, Rudi Martinus van Dijk, Ahmed Essyad, Jacqueline Fontyn, Sylvia Hallett, Donald Harris, Félix Ibarrondo, Oswaldo González, György Kurtág, Philippe Manoury, Patrick Marcland, Luis de Pablo, Yves-Marie Pasquet, Kyriakos Sfetsas, Raymond Vaillant; American composers David Chaitkin, Edmund Cionek, Eugene Kurtz, Allen Shearer, and Dean C. Taylor; British composer Nicholas Maw; Canadian-born Srul Irving Glick; the conductor Alexandros Myrat; and music critic Heinz-Klaus Metzger.

== Family ==
A love of music and music theory ran in the family. His brother was Frederick Dorian (1902–1991); they both studied under Schoenberg in Vienna. Frederick became a music professor at Carnegie Mellon University.

== Legacy ==
Before he died, Deutsch attempted to destroy all of his compositions, so that his only surviving legacy would be his students. However, some of his work survived. Notwithstanding the efforts of Deutsch to destroy his oeuvre, at least a few examples survive.

In late 2013, a recording of Deutsch conducting the Suisse Romande Orchestra in a performance of three "master works" by Arnold Schoenberg was released. It includes short lectures by Deutsch on each of the pieces.

== Works ==
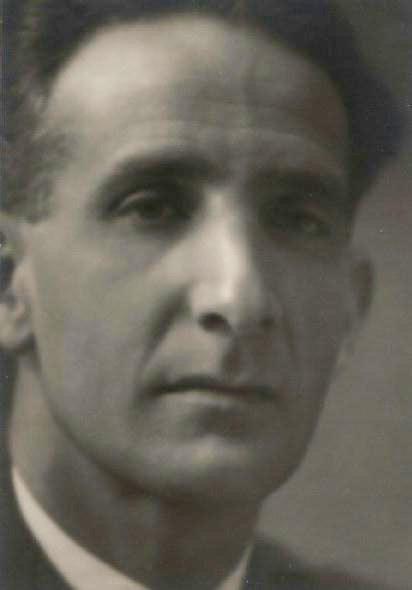
Max Ernst, 1928

- Schach, opera (1923)
- Der Schatz, revue (Moulin Rouge) and film music for G. W. Pabst (1923)
- Die freudlose Gasse (1925)
- Apotheosis, opera (1972)
- Incidental music for Tristan Tzara's epic poem La Fuite (1946)
- Prayer for us carnal, choral symphony with a text by Charles Péguy
- Choirs of men from Vinci

== See also ==
- See: List of music students by teacher: C to F#Max Deutsch.
