= Philippe Capdenat =

French composer (1934–2025)

- Born: 17 July 1934; Bordeaux, France
- Died: 2 May 2025 (aged 90); Paris, France
- Occupations: Classical composer; Professor
- Organizations: Sorbonne; Lyon University; Conservatoire Nadia et Lili Boulanger

Philippe Capdenat (17 July 1934 – 2 May 2025) was a French composer and academic teacher. First a mining engineer, he started composing avant-garde music, but turned to chamber music, music for the stage (opera, ballet, play music) and vocal music, using traditional instruments. He was a teacher at several French universities and conservatories.

== Career ==
Born in Bordeaux, Capdenat attended special courses in mathematics in addition to his schooling, took piano lessons and conducted a youth choir. From 1954 to 1958 he studied mining engineering at the École Nationale Supérieure des Mines in Saint-Étienne, where he also took classes in piano and composition at the conservatory. He served in the military in Algeria for two years. From 1960 to 1967, he worked in Paris as an engineer, but also continued to study music, with Max Deutsch at the École Normale. He was the leader of the Chorale Jéricho and the chamber orchestra Orchestre de Chambre Philippe Capdenat.

In 1967 he toured Denmark, conducting the radio orchestra of Odense. In 1968–69 he collaborated with Maurice Béjart in Brussels on the ballet Je fus cet enfant-là. In 1971, he was awarded the Hervé Dugardin Prize of the Société des auteurs, compositeurs et éditeurs de musique (SACEM), and he decided to concentrate on music in 1978. He composed on commissions from Radio France, the French Ministry of Culture, the Orchestre nationale de Lille and Bordeaux, and the Grand Théâtre in Tours. He collaborated with ensembles including Ensemble Ars Nova, Domaine musical and Ensemble l'Itinéraire, with conductors such as Serge Baudo, Jean-Claude Casadesus, Patrick Fournillier and with Pascal Verrot, and with soloists including Jean-Paul Fouchécourt, Sylvio Gualda, Christian Ivaldi and Mady Mesplé. From 1981 to 1991 he lectured at the Sorbonne, teaching analysis, composition, harmony and counterpoint, and also at Lyon University and Tours University (fr).

In 1992, Capdenat was appointed professor of musical analysis and composition at the École Nationale de Musique et de Danse in Montreuil. From 1995 to 2001 he was director of the department of contemporary music at the Conservatoire Nadia et Lili Boulanger in Paris. Among his students is Mansoor Hosseini. He then became president of the association for contemporary music Opus Open and continued in that post until 2010.

In 1990, he was awarded a prize for composers from SACEM, and in 1996 won a prize from the Académie des Beaux-Arts. In 2001, his opera Une Carmen, loosely based on Bizet's Carmen, re-imagined the topic in Arab-Andalusian style, with Carmen relocated to Morocco and instruments such as the oud, tablah, and quanun, played by Moroccan musicians. Directed by Olivier Desbordes, the Opéra Éclaté performed it at the Les Excentrés festival in Gap and on a national tour. In 2011, Capdenat's Variations received the first prize in the competition of the Orchestre national d'harmonie des jeunes (ONHJ, National youth orchestra), which inviting European composers to write a piece for performance.

== Work ==
Capdenat expressed his goal as "music open to the acquisitions of contemporary language yet retaining the desire to be clear and lyrical and avoiding both demagogy and neo-romanticism". He composed music in genres from chamber music to opera, including aleatoric music, electroacoustics, repetitive music and serialism. After works which were then "avant-garde", he turned to more lyrical music. He composed Croce e delizia for Mady Mesplé, the opera Sébastien en martyr for the Tours Opera, his Requiem for the Festival d’art sacré at Dax, and Le condamné à mort and Une Carmen for the Opéra Éclaté.

=== Selected works ===
The Union Nationale des Compositeurs de Musique offers a list of his works including precise scoring and durations.

- Prélude & fugue for organ Op.0 (1956)
- Irradiations for nine strings Op.1 (1964)
- Batteries for prepared piano Op.2 (1967)
- Concerto italien for prepared piano. celesta, electronic organ, vocal ensemble and orchestra Op.3 (1970)
- Haute surveillance, music for a play, for tape (1970)
- Pentacle for harp, Psalterium and string trio Op.5 (1971)
- Note d'espace for electric cello and tape Op.6 (1972)
- Chrysos, ballet music for tape (1972)
- Wahazzin for solo percussion, three marimbas and a large orchestra Op.4 (1972)
- Croce e delizia for soprano, flute, clarinet, violin, cello and prepared piano Op.7 (1973)
- Symphonèmes for orchestra Op.8 (1973)
- Lysis, music for a play, for tape (1973)
- Stimuli for sounds and instruments Op.9 (1974)
- Rituale per Cenci for bass, organ-synthesizer, wind quintet and two percussionists Op.10 (1974)
- Tahar for twelve strings Op.11 (1975)
- Cérémonie secrète, music for a ballet, for tape (1975)
- Opéra solo for actor pantomime (1975)
- Le silence de l'oiseau de la paix for five winds and orchestra Op.12 (1975)
- Sonata di continuo for electronic cello, prepared piano and tape Op.14 (1978)
- Cassation for two chamber orchestras Op.15 (1979)
- Simple-Double-Triple for ondes martenot, piano, percussion and three orchestras Op.16 (1980)
- I Cenci, opera after Antonin Artaud Op.13 (1981)
- Sinfonia sui Cenci for orchestra Op.17 (1981)
- Palindrome I, Baroque suite for lute and oboe Op.18 (1980)
- Palindrome II for string quartet Op.19 (1981)
- Palindrome III, piano sonata Op.20 (1981)
- Palindrome en Chaconne I for organ Op.21 (1982)
- Palindrome en Chaconne II for orchestra Op.22 (1983)
- Palindrome en Chaconne III for string sextet Op.23 (1983)
- Nadira for soprano, speaker, choir and orchestra Op.24 (1983)
- Batteries II for two prepared pianos Op.25 (1984)
- Erta a tre for wind trio Op.26 (1984)
- Pantoum for mezzo-soprano and piano Op.27 (1983)
- Palindrome en Chaconne IV for piano quintet Op.28 (1988)
- Palindrome en Chaconne VI for twelve strings Op.29 (1986)
- Serenata for double bass and prepared piano Op.30 (1985)
- Six études en variations for two violins Op.31 (1986)
- Sébastien en martyr, chamber opera Op.32 (1986)
- Le Sébastien de Mantegna for baritone and piano Op.32b (1986)
- Flèche de tout bois for clarinet and piano Op.33 (1989)
- Sérénade for double bass quartet Op.34 (1986)
- Le assonanze, trio for ondes Martenot, piano and percussion Op.35 (1987)
- Sade, opera Op.36 (1989)
- Pyramis for piano and two string trios Op.37 (1991)
- Sur le nom de Sade for piano Op.38 (1991)
- Badinerie for harpsichord Op.39 (1991)
- Le chasseur égaré for choir Op.40 (1993)
- Requiem for soprano, baritone, small and large choir, choir organ, grand organ, piano and percussion Op.41 (1993)
- Le sirop d'Eros for soprano, clarinet and piano Op.42 (1993)
- Le sirop d'Eros for soprano, clarinet, horn and string quartet Op.42b (1998)
- Air dodécatonique for baritone, alto saxophone and piano Op.44 (1993)
- Va-t'en, go!, Tango for soprano, clarinet, piano, violin, viola and cello Op.45 (1996)
- Galatée, ekloge for string quartet Op.46 (1999)
- Après une lecture de Pétrarque, madrigal for mixed choir a cappella Op.47 (1999)
- Prose brisée for soprano, baritone and piano Op.47a (1998)
- Sonnet CCLXXIX de Pétrarque for voice and piano Op.48 (1999)
- Vocalise sur les onomatopées for voice and piano Op.48a (1999)
- Sarabande for cello solo Op.49 (1999)
- Palindrome en Chaconne V for wind and string quintet Op.43 (2001)
- Alerte for trumpet solo Op.50 (2000)
- Fanfare for wind quintet Op.51 (2000)
- Le condamné à mort, monodrama for baritone, akkordeon and instrumental ensemble Op.52 (2000)
- ...après une lecture de Pétrarque, madrigal for soprano, tenor and string sextet Op.54 (2003)
- Maris Stella for clarinet and winds Op. 55 (2003)
- Trois danses for alto saxophone and harp Op.56 (2004)
- 2ème quatuor à cordes ("le condamné à mort") for string quartet Op.57 (2005)
