= Takashi Yoshimatsu =

Japanese classical music composer (born 1953)

- 吉松 隆
- Born: March 18, 1953 (age 73); Yoyogi, Tokyo, Japan
- Occupation: Composer
- Years active: 1975–present
- Website: yoshim.music.coocan.jp

Takashi Yoshimatsu (吉松 隆, Yoshimatsu Takashi; born March 18, 1953) is a Japanese classical music composer. He is well known for composing the score for the 2003 remake of Astro Boy.

== Biography ==
Yoshimatsu was born and raised in Yoyogi, Tokyo. He did not receive formal musical training while growing up. Yoshimatsu was a fan of The Walker Brothers and The Ventures when he was 13, but symphonies of Ludwig van Beethoven and Pyotr Ilyich Tchaikovsky fascinated him when he was 14. When he entered Keio High School, he had hoped to go to medical school, but eventually changed his aspirations to become a symphony writer. While studying at the Faculty of Engineering at Keio University, he became an apprentice of Teizo Matsumura. Although he says that he was not influenced in any way by Matsumura's style, his 1974 solo piano piece, To the companion star of Sirius (Op. 1), shows a strong influence of contemporary music, including Matsumura's. He was introduced to Manabu Kawai, a professor at Tokyo University of the Arts, who encouraged him to study harmony and counterpoint, but he gave up taking lessons after a few months and left the university in March 1974. At this time, while composing music as art music, he was also fascinated by progressive rock music such as Pink Floyd, Yes, Emerson, Lake & Palmer, etc., and joined rock bands as a keyboard player.

In 1975, through Matsumura's introduction, Yoshimatsu met Isao Harada, and on November 28, 1978, he made his debut as a composer by presenting Forgetful Angel at a private concert hosted by Harada (although he received no fee for the composition). In the meantime, he entered composition competitions about 20 times and was unsuccessful; however, in 1980, Dorian for orchestra was selected for the Composition Prize of the Foundation for the Promotion of Symphony Music. He composed a number of pieces before making his name with the serialist Threnody to Toki in 1981. In Hiroshi Aoshima's book Composer's Way of Thinking (Kodansha's New Library of Knowledge, 2004), there is a description that he won the Otaka prize for Threnody to Toki (p. 263), but Yoshimatsu himself has denied this on his website.

Soon afterwards, Yoshimatsu became disenchanted with atonal music, and began to compose in a free neo-romantic style with strong influences from jazz, rock and Japanese classical music, notably in his Guitar Concerto (1984).

To date, Yoshimatsu has composed six symphonies and twelve concertos: one each for bassoon, cello, guitar, trombone, alto saxophone, soprano saxophone, marimba, chamber orchestra, traditional Japanese instruments, and two for piano (one for the left hand only and one for both hands). He has also written a number of sonatas, and various shorter pieces for ensembles of various sizes. His 'Atom Hearts Club Suites' for string orchestra explicitly pay homage to the Beatles, Pink Floyd and Emerson, Lake & Palmer.

== Musical style ==
Takashi Yoshimatsu is a contemporary composer. The majority of his work is triadic and contains simple, repeated progressions, or in some cases pandiatonicism. Often extended tertian harmonies are followed by whole tone harmonies (such as in the first movement of Symphony No. 5; or the first movement of his "Cyber Bird" Concerto for alto saxophone, which, in addition, makes use of free atonal jazz; or the final movement of his "Orion Machine" Concerto; or in his Saxophone Concerto "Albireo Mode"). His works for Japanese traditional instruments (such as Subaru, and Within Dreams, Without Dreams) make use of traditional Japanese scales and tunings.

He has published some essays and primers about classical music.

== Notable compositions ==
=== Orchestral works ===
==== Symphonies ====
- 1990 Kamui-Chikap Symphony (Symphony No. 1), Op. 40
- 1991 Symphony No. 2 "At Terra", Op. 43
- 1998 Symphony No. 3, Op. 75
- 2000 Symphony No. 4, Op. 82
- 2001 Symphony No. 5, Op. 87
- 2013 Symphony No. 6 "Birds and Angels", Op. 113

==== Concertante works ====
- 1980 Threnody to Toki, for piano and string orchestra, Op. 12
- 1984 Guitar Concerto, "Pegasus Effect", Op. 21
- 1988 Bassoon Concerto, "Unicorn Circuit", Op. 36
- 1993 Trombone concerto, "Orion Machine", Op. 55
- 1993 Alto saxophone concerto, "Cyber Bird", Op. 59
- 1997 Piano concerto, "Memo Flora", Op. 67
- 1998 While an Angel Falls into a Doze..., for piano and string orchestra, Op. 73
- 2003 Cello concerto, "Centaurus Unit", Op. 91
- 2005 Soprano saxophone concerto, "Albireo mode", Op. 93
- 2007 Concert "Cepheus Note", for piano (left hand) and orchestra, Op. 102
- 2010 Marimba concerto "Bird Rhythmics", Op. 109

==== Other orchestral works ====
- 1979 Dorian, Op. 9
- 1982 Chikap, Op. 14a
- 1986 The Age of Birds, Op. 25
- 1991/1997 White Landscapes, Op. 47a
- 1993/1998 Dream Colored Mobile II, Op. 58a
- 1994 Ode to Birds and Rainbow, Op. 60
- 1997 Atom Hearts Club Suite I, for string orchestra, Op. 70b
- 1997 And Birds Are Still..., Op. 72
- 1999 Atom Hearts Club Suite II, for string orchestra, Op. 79a
- 2000 And Birds sing again..., Op. 81
- 2000 Prelude to the Celebration of Birds, Op. 83
- 2000 Fanfare 2001, Op. 84
- 2008 Academic Festival Overture EX, Op. 103

=== Chamber music ===
- 1978 Forgetful Angel 1, for harmonica (or violin) and piano, Op. 6
- 1979 Forgetful Angel 2, for harmonica and guitar, Op. 8
- 1982 Chikap, for flute choir, Op. 14a
- 1982 Digital Bird Suite, for flute and piano, Op. 15
- 1983 4 Pieces in Bird Shape, for clarinet and piano, Op. 18
- 1984 Birdscape, for marimba, Op. 20
- 1985 Forgetful Angel 3, for harmonica and accordion, Op. 24
- 1987 Piano Quartet "ALRISHA", for flute, violin, cello, and piano, Op. 30
- 1987 Melting Dream, violin (saxophone / harmonica) and piano, Op. 30a
- 1990 Parallel Bird Etude, for 2 clarinets, Op. 39
- 1991 Fuzzy Bird Sonata, for alto saxophone and piano, Op. 44
- 1991 Bird Prism, for 2 flutes and piano, Op. 45
- 1991 Bird Rhythm, for percussion ensemble, Op. 46
- 1993 Dream Colored Mobile I, for saxophone, harp, and string quartet, Op. 58
- 1999 Metal Snail Suite, for euphonium and piano, Op. 80
- 2002 3 Exotic Songs, for soprano saxophone and guitar, Op. 89a
- 2005 Partita a la Cheshire Cat, for piano and percussion, Op. 94

=== Piano solo ===
- 1970 Blue Myths
- 1986-2001 Pleiades Dances
- 1997 Piano Folio...to a Disappeared Pleiad
- 2004 Tapiola Visions for Left Hand, Op. 92
- 2006 Ainola Lyrical Ballads for Piano Left Hand, Op. 95
- 2006 Gauche Dances for Piano Left Hand, Op. 96
- 2008 6 Vignettes for Piano, Op. 105
- 2008 4 Romances from "Villon's Wife"

=== Works for traditional Japanese instruments ===
- 1980 U-Getsu-Fu, for shakuhachi and 17-snare koto, Op. 11
- 1986 Soh-Gyo-Fu, for shakuhachi and 20-snare koto, Op. 26
- 1987 MIROKU effect, for 11 traditional Japanese instruments and strings, Op. 33
- 1997 GAGAKU "Bird Dream Dance", for gagaku ensemble, Op. 69
- 2002 Fugaku ...7 scenes of The Sacred Mount Fuji, for shakuhachi, 20-snare koto and orchestra, Op. 88

=== Works for guitar ===
- Compositions for Guitar by Takashi Yoshimatsu
