= Kyriakos Sfetsas =

Greek composer (1945–2026)

Kyriakos Sfetsas (Greek: Κυριάκος Σφέτσας; 29 September 1945 – 20 April 2026) was a Greek composer. His body of work consists of a large number of compositions: symphonic, choral, ballet and theatre music, chamber, electronic, film scores, pieces for solo instruments, pieces in jazz and fusion style, songs in Greek and world poems.

== Early life ==
Sfetsas was born in Amfilochia and raised in Lefkada where, at an early age, he studied music for the first time at the Philharmonic Band and the National Conservatory of the city with the late Fotis Vlachos. He continued his studies at the National Conservatory of Athens (1963–1966), where he studied the piano with Krino Kalomiri and theory of music with Michalis Vourtsis. On August 30, 1964, in Lefkada, he accompanied Maria Callas on the piano in her last performance in Greece. A few months after the 1967 dictatorship, he moved to Paris. There, on a French State scholarship (1969–1972), he pursued further studies with the composer and educator Max Deutsch (composition, analysis, orchestral conducting), while seeking the mentorship and advice of Iannis Xenakis, Luigi Nono and Henri Dutilleux.

== Composition ==
The first public performance of his work ("Episodes for piano solo") took place just after the uprising of May '68 at the "Latin America Hall" in Paris, receiving favourable reviews. After that, his music was often performed and he had his first commissions (by French Radio and TV, the Ars Nova Orchestra and the Dance Group of Vitry). After that period, several of his works are performed in renowned international contemporary music festivals (Royan, Reims, Bordeaux and Paris); at the same time, he worked on a regular basis with the contemporary dance group of Vitry and the choreographer Michel Cazerta. A portion of his Paris works were published by Editions Transatlantiques, and it was in Paris in 1974 that he released for the first time one of his works on record: Four-channel electro-acoustic music for the "Ballet Smog", one of the first pieces written for four-channel tape in the world. In Greece, he made his debut as a composer at the 4th Hellenic Week of Contemporary Music (Athens, 19–26 September 1971) with his work "Docimology".

He returned to Greece in autumn of 1975, this time to stay. At the invitation of Manos Hatzidakis, he worked at the Third Programme of the Hellenic Radio (1975–1976) as a freelance producer. In 1977, as a regular employee of the Hellenic Radio, he served as head of the music departments of the 2nd and 1st Programmes, and from the summer of 1982 to January 1994 as director of the 3rd Programme. In 1980, his music for Pavlos Tassios' "Parangelia" receives first prize at the Film Festival of Thessaloniki. He also wrote the music for Stigma, by the same director (1982), D. Panagiotatos' The night with Silena (1986), M. Ditsas' Night Exit (1991), N. Grammatikos' U Turn (1991) and "A time to kill" (1993).

Since the recording of "Without Boundaries" (1980), several recordings of his work have been released on several labels (EMI, CBS, ENM, PRAXIS etc.), with favourable reviews. In the spring of 1991, he released his first digital recording (on CD), Silent Days, on UTOPIA; and in 1993, the CD Colours in Double, a tribute to the art of the great traditional music performer Vassilis Soukas, containing the works Colours in Double and Lyrical Suite (recorded live at the Festivals of Irakleion ('88) and Patra ('87)), in which the late musician had substantial solo parts. In 1999, his entire recordings were re-released in 8 CDs on FINEAS, a record label owned by S. Gavrielides Publications.

Most of his work in the last few years has been commissioned by Greek and other cultural authorities and organizations, and has been performed in Europe, Australia and the United States by renowned music ensembles, such as the Bolshoi Soloists, the Ensemble Modern of Frankfurt, Polyrhythmia of Sofia, the Okada percussion ensemble of Tokyo, the Russo and Mlada Quartets, the Symphony Orchestras of Leipzig, Ljubljana, ABC (Australian Radio), ALEA (Boston University), the Orchestra of the Hellenic Radio and the State Orchestra of Thessaloniki. In addition, from its very early days, the Athens Concert Hall (Megaron) has on numerous occasions commissioned and hosted works by Kyriakos Sfetsas, performed by famous Greek and other soloists and ensembles, including the organist Daniel Chorzempa and the Camerata Orchestra.

== Critical response ==
In volume 9B of the Dictionary of World Biography, the music critic Giorgos Leotsakos notes, among other things: "No other Greek 'avant-garde' composer's return to tradition was more impressive than that of Sfetsas. Before 1977, in France, he was distinguished by a sound 'pointillisme': a marked harmonic sensitivity, with which he organized imaginative soundcolour combinations into 'microstructures' spread out in an imaginary sound canvas, bringing to mind the paintings of Joan Miró, who had charmed the composer at the time. (Docimology, one of his more beautiful and characteristic works, is from this period.) Chronologically, his musical turn Concert Music Slides, 1977 follows his coming home (1975): melody (tonal, modal, atonal), themes, elaboration as well as improvisation, 'physical' rhythms (sometimes asymmetrical and folkish), chords contradicted by unisoni, elements or inspirations from folk music (from Greece and Eastern cultures, either traditional or elaborated through 'ethnic' schools) and Byzantine music (his Love Song is performed by a cantor), and other codes or techniques of communication (e.g. jazz, rock). However, by replacing this 'hermetic' idiom with authenticated codes of communication, the music of Sfetsas expands sometimes into great lengths, and reveals a painful loneliness and a quest for the other, in which it is difficult to distinguish between the personal and the socio-environmental factors. Behind the persistence of his writing one can guess a dramatic need for communication. Despite the ruggedness of the themes and some instances of classical 'elaboration', the three parts of his gigantic (duration: 61'46"!) piano suite Cactus Light ('80-'83) often give the impression of one lonely pianist improvising. One of the most fascinating of his latest works is Moments of a Lonesome Town: within the aloneness and inhumanity of the modern world, the quest for the other continues, with a more emphatic lyricism. So, hope still persists."

== Death ==
Sfetsas died on 21 April 2026, at the age of 80.
