= Pleiades Dances =

The Pleiades Dances are a series of solo piano pieces written by contemporary Japanese composer Takashi Yoshimatsu. They are, in the words of the composer, "a newly conceived set of preludes for the modern piano which takes its material from the seven colours of the rainbow, the seven pitches of church modes, and seven metrical units ranging from three to nine beats." Currently ranging from I to IX, these works were written between 1986 and 2001. Each set of Pleiades Dances contains 7 movements, which "are not placed in the order in which they appear in the work for any specific structural or contextual reasons, nor should too much be read into the curious titles [he gave] them." Yoshimatsu, in the preface to these works, encourages free interpretation of these pieces "including tempo, dynamics and frequency of repetition," and suggests that "It may also be enjoyable to play along with the rhythm by a small percussion instrument like the triangle or the tambourine." Each set, however, seems internally dependent, so that within one set of 7, the order can be freely arranged, but the character of each set differs noticeably between each set.

Pleiades Dances set no. VIII is a piano arrangement of the 1999 work for 20 string koto: Subaru. Yoshimatsu augmented the titles of the movements of Subaru to remain consistent with the dance-suite attitude of the other sets of Pleiades Dances.

The Pleiades are a star cluster in the constellation Taurus. The Japanese name for this cluster is Subaru.

== Overview ==
Especially prominent in the Pleiades Dances are the composer's use of changing meter and unconventional time signatures. Though not always accented in the same way, the meters include 8/8, 6/8, 10/8, 5/8, 7/8, 9/16, 13/8, 1/4, 5/4, 6/4, as well as the more ubiquitous 2/4, 3/4, and 4/4 time signatures. Some compositions written in entirely one meter (such as Arabesque in Twilight, which is in 5/8), or consistently alternate between two meters (such as Dance toward West: 8/8 and 6/8; and Dance toward East: 6/8 and 5/8), but the majority change between at least 3 different meters.

Some of the compositions Pleiades Dances also use modal harmony. The Lydian mode and Mixolydian mode both figure prominently into these works. Slightly Bright Waltz, for example, has a prominently Lydian melodic figure (even though the V^{7}–I relationship of the key of D♭ is still maintained with a G♭, and G♭ is not devoid from the piece). The Mixolydian mode can be seen in many of the Pleiades Dances. Pastoral on Summer relies heavily on the lowered 7th, and the mixolydian cadence of v-I can be found in Memory of Prelude, Scene of Rondo, Pastoral on Summer, Rondo ...Spring Comes Again, Interrupted Faint Prelude, Soft Time Dance, Tender Wind Rondo, Andante on Water, Adagio on Metal, Supple Prelude, Waltz in Obtuse Angle, and others.

The Pleiades Dances are printed by Ongaku no Tomo and grouped into three books: The first book contains Pleiades Dances I, II, and IIa (an arrangement of II for violin/flute and piano), the second contains Pleiades Dances III, IV, and V, and the final book contains Pleiades Dances VI, VII, VIII, and IX. These works have been recorded by, among other pianists, Japanese pianist Kyoko Tabe, who also was the pianist of the premiere recording of Yoshimatsu's Piano Concerto: "Memo Flora".

== List of Sets of Pleiades Dances ==
- Pleiades Dances I, Op. 27 (1986)
  1. Floral Dance
  2. Invention for 2 Voices
  3. Apple Seed Dance
  4. Interlude to Water
  5. Leaflet Dance
  6. Invention for about 3 Voices
  7. Platan Dance
- Pleiades Dances II, Op. 28 (1987)
  1. Negative Prelude
  2. Conventional Invention
  3. Alignment Romance
  4. Interlude with Birds
  5. Fragmentary Dance
  6. Dry Little Fuga
  7. Positive Rondo
- Pleiades Dances III, Op. 35 (1988)
  1. Nonchalantry Prelude
  2. Dance toward Left
  3. Globular Romance
  4. Dance toward Right
  5. Interlude with a Hymn
  6. Romance from the Past
  7. Slightly Bright Waltz
- Pleiades Dances IV, Op. 50 (1992)
  1. Memory of Prelude
  2. Canticle of Quiet Rain
  3. Dance toward West
  4. Memory of Interlude
  5. Distant Dark Pastoral
  6. Dance toward East
  7. Season of Alleluia
- Pleiades Dances V, Op. 51 (1992)
  1. Image of Prelude
  2. Pavane in the Dark Morning
  3. Dance in Afternoon
  4. Inclined Elegy
  5. Arabesque in Twilight
  6. Noel in Midnight
  7. Scene of Rondo
- Pleiades Dances VI, Op. 71 (1998)
  1. Prelude to Little Spring
  2. Waltz on Late Spring
  3. Pastoral on Summer
  4. Romance on Listless Summer
  5. Barcalore on Autumn
  6. Pastoral on Winter
  7. Rondo ...Spring Comes Again
- Pleiades Dances VII, Op. 76 (1999)
  1. Interrupted Faint Prelude
  2. Static Dream Pavane
  3. Recounting Waltz
  4. Liquid Invention
  5. Distant Dream Romance
  6. Soft Time Dance
  7. Tender Wind Rondo
- Pleiades Dances VIII, Op. 78a (1999)
  1. Prelude on the Moon
  2. Moderato on Fire
  3. Andante on Water
  4. Scherzo on Wood
  5. Adagio on Metal
  6. Allegro on the Ground
  7. Postlude on the Sun
- Pleiades Dances IX, Op. 85 (2001)
  1. Supple Prelude
  2. Little Crystal Romance
  3. Waltz in Obtuse Angle
  4. Lullaby in the Celestial Night
  5. Romance on a Parabola
  6. Arabesque in Dream
  7. Landscape of Finale
