= Chobani (disambiguation) =

Chobani (stylized as CHOBANI) is an American brand of strained yogurt produced by Chobani, LLC. Chobani may also refer to:

- Chobanids or the Chupanids, descendants of a Mongol family of the Suldus clan that came to prominence in 14th century Persia
- Chobanids (beylik), an Anatolian beylik founded by the dynasty of the same name and controlled the region in and around the northern Central Anatolian city of Kastamonu in the 13th century

== See also ==
- Chobanian, a surname
