= David Leisner =

American guitarist and composer

- Born: December 22, 1953 (age 72); Los Angeles, California, United States
- Education: Wesleyan University
- Known for: Guitar, composing, writing, teaching
- Style: Classical, contemporary
- Spouse: Ralph Jackson
- Website: David Leisner

David Leisner (born December 22, 1953) is an American classical guitarist, composer and teacher whose activities include recording, arranging and writing about music. He has performed as a concert guitarist and as soloist with orchestras at international music festivals and venues including Carnegie Hall and the 92nd St. Y in New York, Jordan Hall in Boston, Royce Hall in Los Angeles and the Guitar Foundation of America International Festival. His performances, compositions, recordings and research are credited with expanding the guitar repertoire through advocacy for neglected composers and music, newly commissioned works and original arrangements. American Record Guide critic Kenneth Keaton wrote, "Leisner is among the finest guitarists performing … He has a probing intellect, finding insights in music that most others miss, and delivering them with a virtuoso technique."

Leisner lives in New York City with Ralph Jackson, his husband and partner since 1981. He is a professor at the Manhattan School of Music.

== Early life and career ==
Leisner was born on December 22, 1953 in Los Angeles, California. After beginning with the violin, he turned to the guitar and folk music, studied flamenco and took up classical music in his teens. He is largely self-taught as both a guitarist and composer, having majored in music at Wesleyan University but with an equal focus on liberal arts subjects. At various points he briefly studied guitar with John W. Duarte, David Starobin and Angelo Gilardino, composition with Richard Winslow (at Wesleyan), Virgil Thomson and Charles Turner, and orchestration with David Del Tredici.

From 1976 to 1979, Leisner taught guitar at Amherst College. He moved to New York in 1979, building his reputation as a performer through competitions, recitals and local performances in restaurants. He tied for second place in the 1975 Toronto International Guitar Competition and won the Silver Medal at the 1981 Geneva International Guitar Competition—the first American finalist in the latter's history. He made his New York debut at Merkin Hall in 1979. A The New York Times review of the debut called him a "triple threat performer" for his guitar playing, composing and singing, while noting his adroit handling of "the contrapuntal intricacies" of Bach and the required "coloristic touches" for Britten and Albéniz on the guitar.

Over the next five years, wrote critic Allan Kozinn, Leisner "established a reputation not only as an exceptionally talented classical performer but also as a kind of musical investigator" unearthing obscure works for the guitar repertoire. Other writers placed him as "among the most innovative" of a new crop of "young American guitar virtuosos."

=== Focal dystonia and Playing with Ease ===
In 1984 Leisner developed focal dystonia in his right (plucking) hand. Widely regarded as incurable, it kept him from performing professionally for roughly a decade. After an exhaustive and unsuccessful five-year search for a cure, he retooled his playing by primarily using his thumb and index finger and began performing again publicly in 1991. Boston Globe critic Richard Dyer called his first full-evening performance in Jordan Hall "accomplished and moving" with vigor, dexterity and "virtuosity aplenty."

Continuing to rethink his technique, Leisner experimented with involving the larger muscle groups in the upper arm and shoulder and regained normal use of his fingers one by one, returning to 100% capability by 1996. During the 1996-97 season, he performed a challenging series of three concerts at Weill Hall at Carnegie Hall—an all-Bach program, a contemporary music survey, and music of the 19th-century. Guitar Review's Rose Augustine deemed the Bach concert a convincing and "triumphant reappearance" with rare depth of feeling.

Leisner has since helped cure a range of instrumentalists suffering from focal dystonia and other repetitive-stress injuries with the approach covered in his book on ergonomic technique, Playing With Ease. It discusses basic anatomy of movement, posture, alignment, the relief of tension, and practice and concert preparation tips, as well as his ideas about large-muscle engagement that cured him of focal dystonia.

== Music and critical reception ==
Leisner is as recognized for his artistic breadth as for the virtuosity of his playing. As a composer, his wide-ranging influences include Britten, Stravinsky, Bartok, Heitor Villa-Lobos and Philip Glass, among others, and more broadly, pop, folk and jazz music. Richard Dyer characterized Leisner as a "serious, exploratory and imaginative musician and composer who happened to play the guitar as well." Ian Gallagher of Guitar Review noted his propensity "to eschew the intellect for the soul" in compositions that made "a strong argument for the viability of contemporary tonal music and for the fusion of performer and composer in an age of specialization."

Critics have identified a "pedagogic but unpompous" approach to repertoire in Leisner's career, distinguished by discoveries of overlooked composers, creative takes on classics, and commissions and introductions of important new works. His efforts led a revival of two 19th-century composer-guitarists, Johann Kaspar Mertz and Wenzeslaus Matiegka. In addition to arrangements of Bach, Schubert and Glass, he has premiered works by Richard Rodney Bennett, Chester Biscardi, David Del Tredici, Osvaldo Golijov, Pierre Jalbert, Laura Kaminsky, Bun-Ching Lam, João Luiz, Ned Rorem, Peter Sculthorpe, Virgil Thomson and Randall Woolf.

=== Performing ===
Critics characterize Leisner's playing for its blending of control and dexterity with deep expressivity, color, intimacy and spontaneity. Composer and musicologist Angelo Gilardino stated, "what sets Leisner apart is the refinement of his phrasing, which he imbues with clear, convincing and original intentions. He does so in an elegant manner … His playing is authoritative, without trying to appear so." Reviews of Leisner's solo recitals have highlighted, among others, his performances of Ginastera's "Guitar Sonata," Villa-Lobos's "Twelve Etudes," Bach's Chaconne and Lute suites, and his own "Nel Mezzo: Sonata." His Ginastera rendering has been described as "controlled abandon," "majestic and playful, with effortless rhythmic drive," and "an exhilarating display of artistic intelligence and control."

Leisner has performed with cellist Zuill Bailey, flutists Tara O'Connor and Eugenia Zukerman, violinists Ida Kavafian and Mark Peskanov, vocalists Michael Kelly, Rufus Müller, Kurt Ollmann, Lucy Shelton and Sanford Sylvan, and the St. Lawrence, Ensō and Vermeer string quartets, among others.

==== Performance recordings ====
Leisner's first solo recording delved into two lesser-known guitar composers of the 19th-century. The Viennese Guitar (1980) was split between pieces by Johann Kaspar Mertz and Mauro Giuliani and was the first recording to feature Mertz's work. Along with Leisner's publishing efforts, it helped to establish the composer's significance, distinctive romantic personality and melodic gifts through works American Record Guide described as "fascinatingly and superbly crafted" and performed with "conviction, sensitivity and complete technical assurance." For JS Bach (Works for Solo Guitar) (1999), Leisner arranged some of Bach's lute, cello and flute works, embellishing the repeats freely, as Bach would have done, according to the journal Andante. Reviews described it as "some of the most stimulating Bach of recent years" and "an accurate interpretation in pursuit of a fluid expressive naturalness."

With Heitor Villa-Lobos: The Complete Solo Guitar Works (2000), Leisner made one of the first recordings of the composer's recently discovered original 1928 manuscript for his "Twelve Etudes." Breaking with convention, he brought out the work's lush melodies, rhythmic interplay and nuance rather than approach it as a showcase for dexterity and speed. Reviews contended that the recording offered startling new insights, making "a persuasive case for the composer's first thoughts [and] a valuable addition to the guitar catalog." Leisner returned to the 19th century with Le Romantique: Music of Mertz and Schubert (2004) and Matiegka, the Beethoven of the Guitar (2009). Like his work on Mertz, the latter recording advocated for Matiegka, another overlooked guitar composer, as highly inventive and central to the guitar repertoire of his era through assertive, elegant interpretations.

With Music of the Human Spirit (2002), Leisner turned to contemporary work—by Ginastera, Glass, Rorem, Sculthorpe, Harrison, Poulenc and Richard Winslow—chosen for its rebalancing of heart, mind and spirit over the purely cerebral. Favorites (2012) was a kind of summation of the guitar repertoire, mixing daunting "pinnacle" works (Britten's "Nocturnal," Bach's Chaconne and Paganini's "Grand Sonata") with lighter, under-recognized character pieces by Alexander Ivanov-Kramskoi.

On Facts of Life (2015), Leisner placed Bach’s "Lute Suite BWV 997" between contemporary works: the 35-minute, four-movement title track he commissioned from David Del Tredici and the surreal, kaleidoscopic "Fish Tale," commissioned for flutist Eugenia Zukerman and him, by Osvaldo Golijov. American Record Guide predicted that Del Tredici's piece, symphonic in scope, with a sonata-like opener, lively fugue, an "achingly beautiful" slow movement, and flamenco finale, would become a become a seminal guitar work.

Arpeggione (2016) was a cello and guitar collaboration, with cellist Zuill Bailey. Allmusic described Leisner's arrangements—of 19th-century works by Schubert (Arpeggione Sonata) and Falla, among others—as intelligent, direct musical solutions yielding warmly songful (Bailey) and beautifully understated (Leisner) playing. In his arrangement of Schubert's song cycle, Die Schöne Müllerin (2022, with baritone Michael Kelly), Leisner eschewed the literal in favor of capturing the piece's essence. Reviews distinguished the treatment from prior recordings by its intimate, emotional quality and emphasis on the music's folk song roots; American Record Guide called Leisner's clear and flexible accompaniment "riveting, with many arresting touches."

=== Composing ===
Critics distinguish Leisner's compositions for their emotional and dramatic power, openness to diverse musical forms, idioms, instruments and inspirations, and "performability," a quality sometimes lacking in non-players' works. He has written works for a wide range of contexts, most notably chamber music with and without guitar, and music for solo guitar, voice with various instruments, and orchestra.

The recording Acrobats: Music of David Leisner (2007), by the Cavatina Duo, features works written for the flute and guitar, including one with added clarinet and one with cello. Two of these works have received wide attention. The first, "Dances in the Madhouse" (1982), was inspired by a lithograph by painter George Bellows depicting four groups of asylum residents dancing. A suite in four movements—tango, waltz, ballad and samba—it is marked by imaginative shifts in mood and character, humor and spontaneity. The second, "Acrobats" (2002), is a three-movement piece that Allan Kozinn called, "a sometimes eerie, sometimes lively fantasy that draws fully on the coloristic aspects of both [its] instruments." Inspired by a Nathan Englander story in which a group of World War II-era Jews evade the concentration camps by chance when they board a train of circus performers, it begins at a moment of immediacy where the story ends, when the escapees must perform to maintain their cover. Two other key chamber works employ guitar and string quartet: "Vision of Orpheus" (2000) and "Love Dreams of the Exile" (2015, with flute). The five-movement former piece explored its myth's cycle of loss, death and rebirth, ending in quiet despair. The latter, in three movements, offers what Fanfare called "stream-of consciousness meditations" on Sephardic folk songs that "deal with love: unrequited, rejected, or betrayed."

Guitar Review described Leisner's solo guitar compositions as emotionally "dizzying" and exuding "creativity and expression [with] an almost improvisatory quality." His recording Self-Portrait (2008) features many of these works, among them "Freedom Fantasies"—inventive, bluesy interpretations of three American spirituals—and the three-movement "Nel Mezzo: Sonata." Leisner composed this restless and searching work (whose Dante-derived title translates as "in the middle") during the mid-life crisis prompted by his hand injury. Critics likened its stark contrasts, obsessive character and emotional journey through conflict, poignancy and defiance to works by Hector Berlioz.

Leisner has composed many works for voice and varied instruments. Richard Dyer characterized these pieces by their good literary judgment, imagination and taste in "taking poems from disparate sources and putting them into cycles that trace emotional progress and develop dramatic shape." Some of them are collected on Leisner's recording, Letter to the World (2022). "Confiding" (1985–86, originally for soprano and guitar, here for soprano and piano) is a ten-song cycle with folk-inflected harmonies that features poems by Emily Brontë and Emily Dickinson tracing the rise and fall of an intimate relationship before a turn to supra-human elements. "Of Darkness and Light" (2002, for tenor, violin, oboe and piano) sets five Wendell Berry poems from the Vietnam War era about darkness and light to music that moves through thoughtfulness, passion and anxiety to beauty; "Das Wunderbare Wesen" (2011, baritone and cello, for Wolfgang Holzmair) sets five German translations of Lao Tsu’s Tao Te Ching in songs expressing the mystical spirituality of Taoism. An early work, "Simple Songs" (1982, for baritone and guitar) placed six poems by Emily Dickinson covering a range of emotions and explored various contrapuntal and rhythmic complexities.

Leisner has also written several works for orchestra. "Embrace of Peace" (1991, commissioned by the Fairfield Orchestra), inspired by a painting by George Tooker, was described as a "striving, passionate and hopeful" tone poem whose imaginative combinations of instruments and dissonances set up warm and satisfying resolutions. "Wayfaring" (2022, guitar and full orchestra) is a three-movement work written for guitarist Pepe Romero, based on the folk song/spiritual, "Wayfaring Stranger." Its emotional tapestry moves through a restless opening and dissonant middle to a simpler, jubilant final movement.

== Writing, teaching and other professional activities ==
In addition to writing Playing With Ease (2018), Leisner has published articles for Classical Guitar, Musical America and Soundboard, among others, on the need for the reintegration of performance and composition, musical technique, performance anxiety, and contemporary composers and compositions.

Leisner is a masterclass teacher and member of the faculty at the Manhattan School of Music, where he has served since 1993, including as chair of the guitar department. He taught at the New England Conservatory from 1980–2003.

From 2008 to 2019, he was the artistic director of Guitar Plus, a New York concert series devoted to guitar chamber music and diverse programming.

== Recording list ==
=== Selected performance recordings ===
- The Viennese Guitar, Titanic (1980)
- JS Bach (Works for Solo Guitar), Azica (2000)
- Heitor Villa-Lobos: The Complete Solo Guitar Works, Azica (2000)
- Music of Hovhaness ("Spirit of Trees"), with Yolanda Kondonassis, harp, Telarc (2000)
- Music of the Human Spirit, Azica (2002)
- Le Romantique: Music of Mertz and Schubert, Azica (2003)
- Alan Hovhaness ("Guitar Concerto”, op. 325), Naxos (2006)
- Matiegka, the Beethoven of the Guitar, Azica (2009)
- David Leisner: Classics & Discoveries, MelBay DVD (2010)
- Favorites, Azica (2012)
- Facts of Life, Azica (2015)
- Arpeggione, with Zuill Bailey, cello, Azica (2016)
- Die Schöne Müllerin, with Michael Kelly, baritone, Bright Shiny Things (2022)

=== Selected composition recordings ===
- Self-Portrait, featuring Leisner, Azica (2006)
- Acrobats: Music of David Leisner, featuring the Cavatina Duo, Cedille Records (2007)
- Love Dreams of the Exile, on Sephardic Journey, featuring the Cavatina Duo and Avalon String Quartet, Cedille (2016)
- Eve’s Diary, featuring the Olson/De Cari Duo, CD Baby (2018)
- Letter to the World, featuring Katherine Whyte, Andrew Fuchs, Michael Kelly, Sarah Whitney, Scott Bartucca, Raman Ramikrishnan, Lenore Fishman Davis, Dimitri Dover and Leisner, Azica (2022)

== Selected compositions ==
- "Dances in the Madhouse" (violin/flute, guitar), 1982
- "Confiding" (high voice, piano/medium voice, piano/soprano, guitar), 1985–86
- "Embrace of Peace" (orchestra), 1991
- "Nel Mezzo: Sonata" (solo guitar), 1998
- "Vision of Orpheus" (guitar, string quartet), 2000
- "Acrobats" (flute, guitar), 2002
- "Of Darkness and Light" (tenor, violin, oboe, piano), 2002
- "Three James Tate Songs" (medium voice, guitar), 2007
- "West Wind" (tenor, guitar), 2011
- "Das Wunderbare Wesen" (baritone, cello), 2011
- "Eve's Diary" (soprano, guitar), 2015
- "Love Dreams of the Exile" (flute, guitar, string quartet), 2015
- "Pranayama" (orchestra), 2016
- "Medanales Morning" (guitar orchestra), 2019
- "Wayfaring" (guitar, orchestra), 2022
