= Loris Chobanian =

American-Armenian composer and performer (1933-2023)

Loris Ohannes Chobanian (April 17, 1933 – May 14, 2023) was an American-Iraqi-Armenian composer of classical music, conductor, and guitar and lute teacher and performer. He served as Professor of Composition as well as Composer-in-Residence at Baldwin-Wallace College Conservatory.

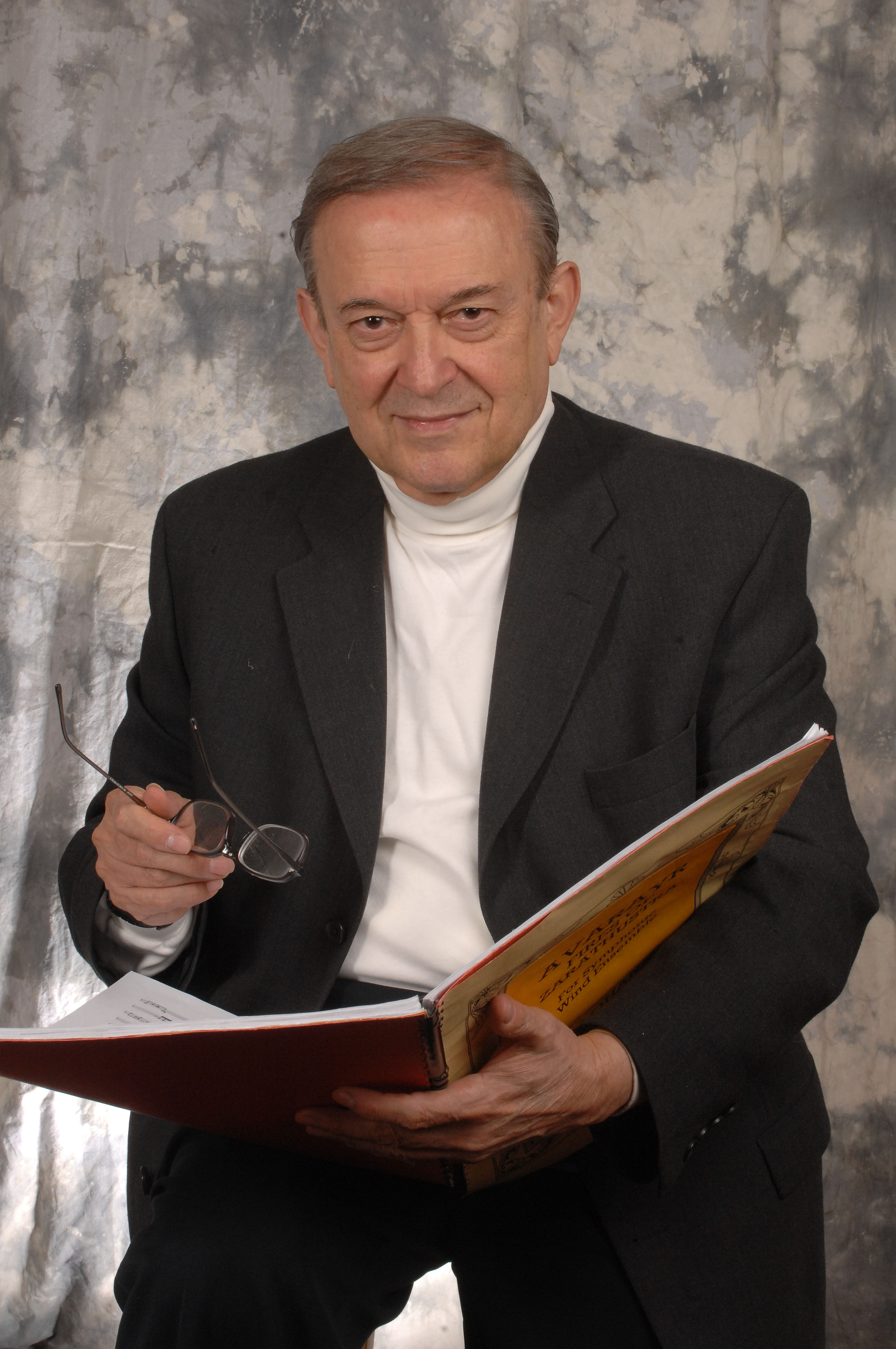
Loris Chobanian

== Life ==
Born on April 17, 1933, in Mosul, Iraq, Chobanian was introduced to classical music at an early age. His father Ohannes Chobanian, an oil engineer and an amateur musician, was a performer on the piano, the flute and the violin. When he was five years old, the senior Chobanian wrote a one-man operetta, "O Loris," which the young Chobanian sang in Kirkuk, Iraq, with his father conducting the orchestra.

In 1951, he graduated from Baghdad College, a High School administered by American Jesuits from Boston, Mass. For ten years, he joined the Komitas Choir in Baghdad that specialized in singing Armenian folk music.

Chobanian studied the classical guitar with Jacque Tchakerian and in 1955 began performing classical guitar regularly on Baghdad Television and worked at the Khanaqin Oil Company. During 1958–1960 he was appointed Secretary to the Director General of Distribution of Oil in Iraq.

Chobanian died on May 14, 2023, aged 90, after an extended illness. Loris is survived by his wife, daughter, grandchildren, and numerous nieces, nephews and cousins. He was interred in Canton, Ohio, at Sunset Hills Burial Park.

== Career in the USA ==
In 1960, he moved to the US to study composition at Louisiana State University (1960–1966) where he completed his bachelor's and master's degrees studying with Kenneth Klaus. He performed regularly on WBRZ-TV Baton Rouge, LA, and later in Michigan performing for the National Educational Television. He received the Ph.D. in music composition from Michigan State University (1970) studying with H. Owen Reed.

He was instrumental in establishing the Baldwin-Wallace Conservatory of Music Guitar and Composition programs as well as the Focus Contemporary Music Festival. He has taught at the Oberlin Conservatory of Music and the University of Akron.

In 1973, he became the first Guitar Division Chairman of the American String Teachers Association. He organized the first ASTA Guitar Conference in Cleveland, which for the first time brought together the university and college guitar teachers in the US and Canada. The conference became the model that has been emulated by conferences of the Guitar Foundation of America ever since.

Winner of many ASCAP awards and grants from the Ohio Arts Council and the Cleveland Arts Council, he also received an award for excellence from the University of Loyola, New Orleans, LA. He was the recipient of the 1981 Cleveland Arts Prize.

== Commissions ==
Among his many commissions include those from the Cleveland Ballet, the Ohio Chamber Orchestra, the American Wind Symphony Orchestra, the Toronto International Guitar Festival, the Armenian Philharmonic Orchestra, the Groton Central School in New York City, the Nebraska Wesleyan University, the Cleveland Chamber Symphony, the Skidmore College Orchestra (Saratoga Springs, New York), and the University of St. Thomas (St. Paul, Minnesota).

== Performances of his work ==
=== Academic year 2005–2006 ===
- Miniatures for Violoncello and Orchestra was premiered by the BW Symphony Orchestra conducted by Dwight Oltman with Regina Mushabac, cello
- Divertimento was premiered with a Cello Orchestra of forty cellists conducted by the composer
- The Mad Violin for solo violin which was written for and premiered by violinist Julian Ross

=== 2007 ===
- Texturas – Piano Trio No. 2, in five movements, was premiered by the Elysian Trio.
- January 28, 2007, the BW Conservatory Faculty presented an all Chobanian Solo and Chamber Music concert at the Gamble Auditorium of the Conservatory, ending with the composer conducting the World Premiere of Rhapsody for Alto Saxophone and Strings with Greg Banaszak, saxophone, and the BW String Faculty Quintet.
- March 8, 2007, the University of Minnesota presented a festival of Chobanian's music entitled "CHOBANIANA" in which eight of his compositions were performed.
- Armenian Rhapsody for Guitar and Symphonic Wind Ensemble was commissioned and premiered March 9, 2007, by the University of St. Thomas Symphonic Wind Ensemble, conducted by Matthew George, with Christopher Kachian, guitar solo. The commission stipulated that the work, for Guitar and Symphonic Wind Ensemble, be based upon the Armenian melodic tradition.
- May 2007, the University of St. Thomas ensemble performed Armenian Rhapsody on tour in major cities in China. Chinese audiences received the work enthusiastically. On January 25, 2008, the cello version of Armenian Rhapsody was premiered by Regina Mushabac with the BW Symphonic Wind Ensemble conducted by Dwight Oltman.
- December 1, 2007, the Baldwin-Wallace College Singers, conducted by Mel Unger, presented the world premiere of Requiem - April 24 in Armenian text, to commemorate the Armenian genocide. The program also featured Chobanian's Kaddish for a young Artist, in Aramaic, to commemorate the Jewish Holocaust. The BW Singers learned the Armenian text phonetically.

=== 2008 ===
- Tango Fantasy was premiered on March 5, 2008, by the BW Symphony Orchestra conducted by Dwight Oltman with BW Alumna flamenco/classical guitarist Marija Temo
- September 13, 2008 Dialogue – Sonata for Two Pianos was premiered by Nicole Keller and William Shaffer, pianos.
- Music for Lauren, a collection of ten Piano Solos was premiered by Robert Mayerovitch, piano, September 20, 2008.
- December 14, 2008 Dowland In Armenia for String Orchestra was premiered by the BW Youth Orchestra conducted by the composer.

=== 2009 ===
- February 27, 2009, the BW Symphony Orchestra, conducted by Dwight Oltman, presented the US Premiere of Legends for String Orchestra. Capriccio for Violin and Symphonic Wind Ensemble was also premiered by Julian Ross, violin, the BW Symphonic Wind ensemble conducted by Dwight Oltman.

=== 2015 ===
Blue Lake Fine Arts Camp Session 2 Symphony Band, Jane Church conductor, performed Movements 1, 2 and 4 of Armenian Dances on July 26 at the camp located in Michigan.

== Discography ==
- 1973 - Baldwin-Wallace College - Conservatory Encores - United Sound - "Adagio Lagnoso And Delirante"
- 1975 - Baldwin-Wallace College - The 31st Annual Summer High School Music Clinic - Century Advent Recording - "Armenian Dances"
- 1978 - The Ithaca College Concert Band – Bandfare Vol. 10 - Shawnee Press - "Armenian Dances"
- 1981 - University Of Northern Colorado School Of Music Wind Ensemble – Omnibus - Soundmark - "Armenian Dances"
- 1983 - Concertwerken voor Harmonieorkest - Eurosound - "Armeense Dansen"
- 1983 - Grand Rapids Symphonic Band – Favorites - Self-Released - "Armenian Dances"
- 1988 - Peter Croton – The Renaissance Lute, Yesterday And Today - Musicaphon - "Dowland In Armenia"
- 1990 - Buffalo Guitar Quartet – New Music For Four Guitars - New World Records - "Sonics"
- 1993 - William Kanengiser – Echoes Of The Old World - GSP Records - "Dowland In Armenia"
- 1995 - Susan Grisanti – Great Classics, Vol. II, Music Along The Romanesque Road - Blaze Of Glory Records - "Taqseem / Morrish Mosaics"
- 1996 - Baldwin-Wallace College - The Conservatory - Self-Released - "Forum Of The Gods"
- 1998 - The JAM Quartet – Jamerica: Guitar Misic From The New World - BIS - "Sonics"
- 2000 - University Of Illinois Symphonic Band – In Concert: The Begian Years Vol. XIV - Mark records - "Armenian Dances"
- 2001 - Marija Temo - The Music of Loris Ohannes Chobanian - Self-Released - "Concierto del Fuego"
- 2009 - University Of St. Thomas Symphonic Wind Ensemble - Out Of Nowhere - Innova Recordings - "Armenian Rhapsody For Guitar And Symphonic Wind Ensemble"
- 2013 - The Arvey-Francis Duo – Late Nights In West Seattle - Self-Released - "Maharaja's Fancy (For Three Guitars)"
