= Colette Bailly =

French pianist and composer (1928–1976)

- Born: 27 August 1928; Île Barbe, Lyon, France
- Died: 18 November 1976 (aged 48); Paris, France
- Occupation: Classical pianist

Colette Jeanne Antonine Bailly (27 August 1928 – 18 November 1976) was a French pianist and composer, who was a student of Max Deutsch in Paris. She died in Paris on 18 November 1976, at the age of 48.

== Selected works ==
- Chamber symphony (1968)
- Ko-hi-nhor for orchestra (1974)
- Trio de chambre for piano, violin and cello (1968), premiered by the Altenberg Trio
