= Yoshihisa Taira =

Japanese-born French composer

- 平 義久
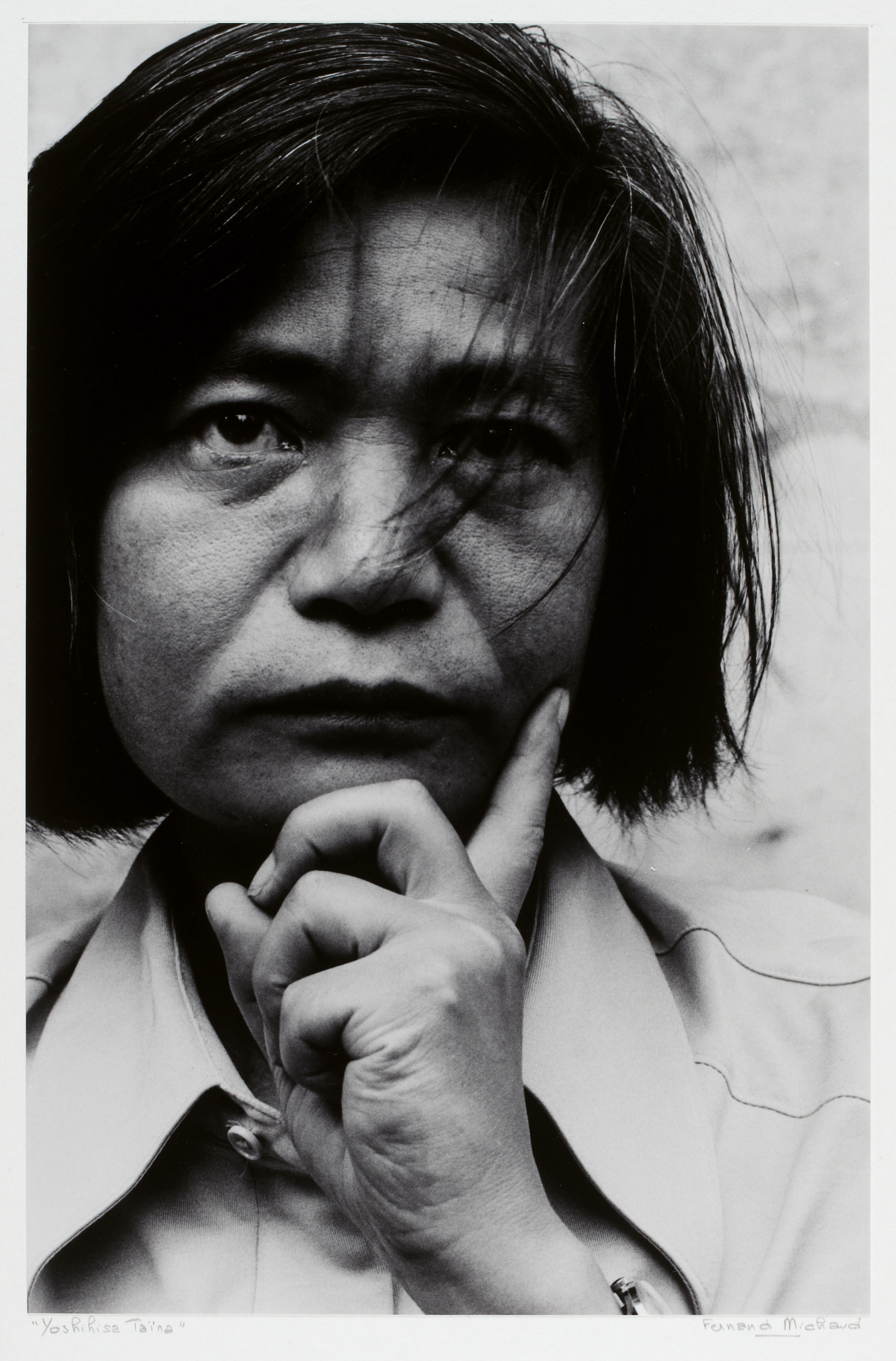
- Portrait by Fernand Michaud, 1984
- Born: March 3, 1937; Tokyo, Japan
- Died: March 13, 2005 (aged 67); Paris, France
- Occupation: Composer

Yoshihisa Taira (or Taïra) (平 義久, Taira Yoshihisa; 3 March 1937 – 13 March 2005) was a Japanese composer of contemporary classical music primarily active in France. Grove Music Online remarks that "His treatment of time and space, sonority, poetic lyricism, silence [...] were derived from traditional Japanese music and art, and are compatible with a French modernist aesthetic".

== Biography ==
Yoshihisa Taïra was born in Tokyo on 3 March 1937. Initially, he attended the Tokyo University of the Arts, studying composition under Tomojirō Ikenouchi, and graduating in 1965. He then arrived in France to study at the Conservatoire de Paris; his teachers there included André Jolivet, Henri Dutilleux, Olivier Messiaen, Taïra also studied with Iannis Xenakis.

He was a composition lecturer at the École Normale de Musique in Paris. Among his best-known students at École Normale were Chien-Hui Hung, Mansoor Hosseini and Malika Kishino.

Taïra died in Paris, on 13 March 2005.

== Works ==
Source: Taira's works are partially published by Éditions Musicales Transatlantiques.

=== Orchestra ===
- Hiérophonie III
- Stratus for flute, harp and strings ensemble
- Chromophonie
- Sonomorphie III
- Méditations
- Trans-apparence
- Erosion I for flute and orchestra
- Moksa, vimoksa
- Tourbillon for 6 percussionists and orchestra
- Polyèdre

=== Chamber music ===
- Hiérophonie I for 4 cellos
- Hiérophonie II for 15 instruments
- Fusion for 2 flutists and 3 percussionists
- Stratus for harp and flute
- Dioptase for three strings
- Radiance for solo piano and 13 instruments
- Eveil for oboe and harp
- Interférences I for and cellos
- Clea for 12 strings
- Dimorphie for 2 percussions
- Fu-mon for 4 flutes
- Ressac for 13 instruments
- Pénombres I for 2 guitars and 12 strings
- Pénombres II for double bass and piano
- Synchronie for 2 flutes or flute and shakuhachi
- Pénombres III for harp and small ensemble
- Pénombres V for viola and piano (1996)
- Pénombres VI for alto saxophone and piano
- Flautissimo for 32 flutes
- Aïalos for G flute and harp
- Synergie for 2 double basses

=== Instrumental ===
- Sonate for violin
- Sonate for viola
- Sonomorphie I for piano
- Sublimation for harp
- Hiérophonie IV for 4 flutes (one performer)
- Maya for bass flute in C or alto flute in G
- Convergence I for marimba
- Convergence II for double bass
- Convergence III for violin
- Cadenza I for flute
- Monodrame I for percussion
- Monodrame II for bassoon
- Monodrame III for guitar
- Monodrame IV for vibraphone
