= Mansoor Hosseini =

Iranian-Swedish percussionist and composer

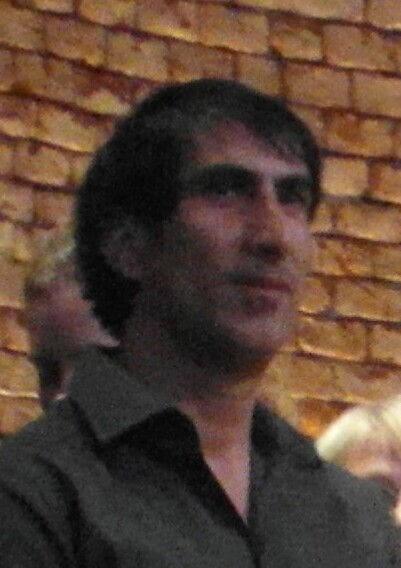
- Mansoor Hosseini, in 2014
- Born: 1967 (age 57–58); Iran
- Education: Royal Conservatory of Brussels; University of Gothenburg
- Occupations: Composer of classical music; Percussionist

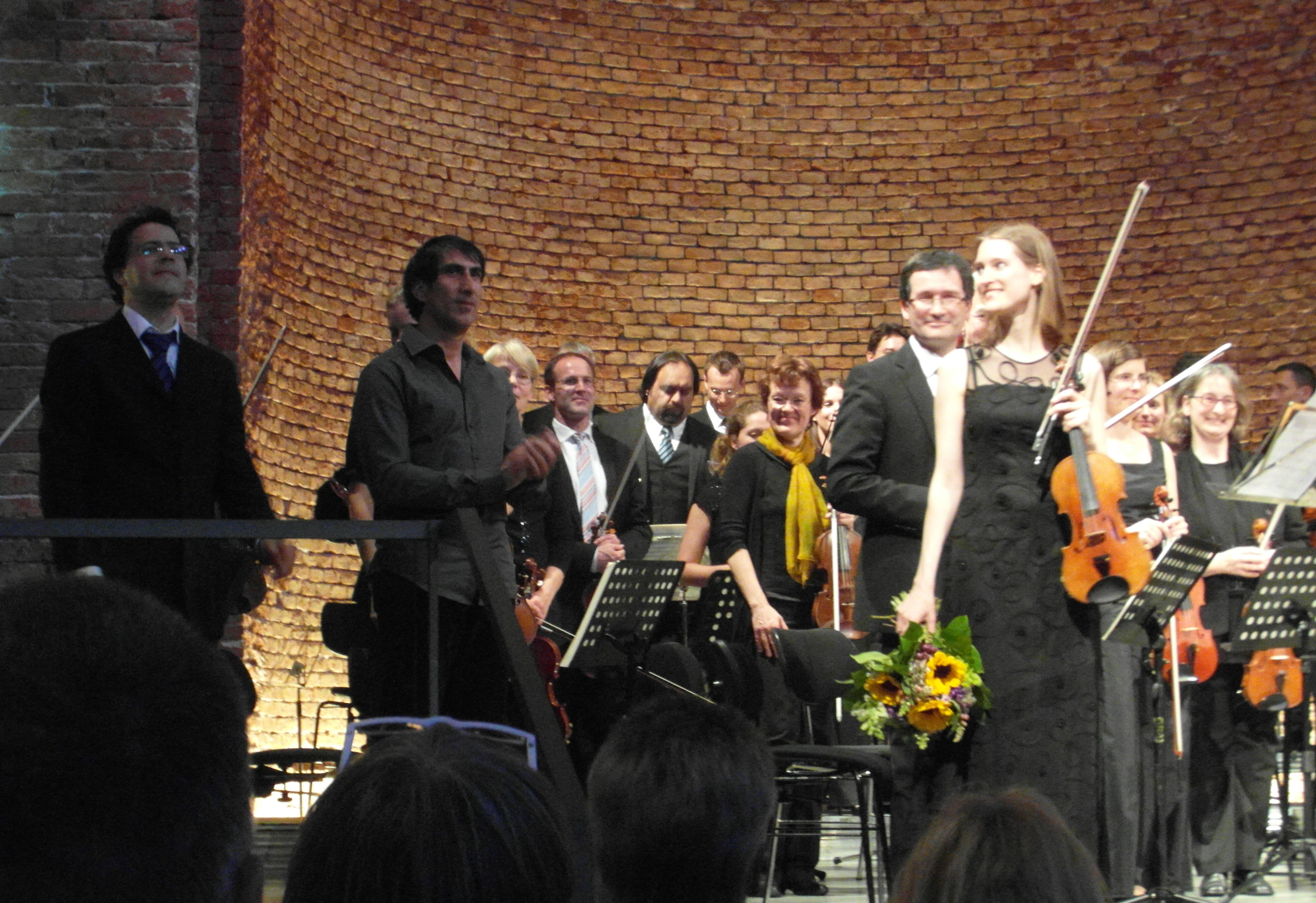
The composer applauding conductor Manuel Nawri (left), violinist Henja Semmler and the Nymphenburger Kammerorchester after the premiere of Bright Blue Bird, In A Grey Red Sky at the Allerheiligen-Hofkirche, Munich, 2014

Mansoor Hosseini (Persian: منصور حسینی; born 1967) is an Iranian-Swedish percussionist and composer of classical music, born in Iran, who studied in Paris and Brussels. His works comprise chamber music and orchestral pieces. He founded the Ensemble Themus in Gothenburg, focussed on theatrical music.

== Career ==
Hosseini studied composition with Philippe Capdenat and Yoshihisa Taïra in Paris. He studied music theory and computer music with Peter Swinnen at the Royal Conservatory of Brussels and composition with Carl-Axel Hall in the Musikhögskolan (sv) of Gothenborg. He later studied film scoring at the University of Gothenburg, and scriptwriting at the film school, now the Akademin Valand. He studied with George Aperghis who encouraged him to compose theatrical music in the style of Mauricio Kagel.

In 2003, Hosseini founded the Gothenburg Music & Dance Company (GMDC), which in 2007 transformed into the Ensemble Themus in Gothenburg with a mission to popularize the concept of theatrical music by allowing actors and musicians to swap and intermingle their roles. His work in the field is inspired by modern dance, theatre and martial arts.

Hosseini has a great interest in improvisation both as a composer and performer. He sometimes adds sections to his compositions which are marked to let the musicians know that they can improvise in a controlled and measured way. He has been a lecturer in musical notation, composition, communication between musicians and composers, and the comprehension of musical notation for musicians.

He was awarded prizes, including the culture prizes of Gothenborg and of the Västra Götaland.

== Works ==
Hosseini's duo Bones (second piece) for piano and cello was composed in 1998, described as a race of the two instruments, with "buddhistic cluster sounds" in the piano and "roaring three-notes" in the cello that "float and combine like dream sequence". His string quartet Esfand II was premiered at the Sibelius Museum (fi) in Turku in 2011, when the town was a European Capital of Culture.

His composition Bright Blue Bird, In A Grey Red Sky for violin and orchestra was premiered on 22 June 2014 at the Allerheiligen-Hofkirche in Munich by the Nymphenburger Kammerorchester with Henja Semmler as the violinist and Manuel Nawri conducting. The work is based on a Persian legend about the mythical bird Simurgh. A thousand birds travel to find his feather (and enlightenment), but after a hard journey only 30 of them reach the destination, which turns out to be a lake reflecting their image.

== List of selected works ==
Orchestra

- 2017 Wings & Chains, double bass concerto, wind orchestra, percussion
- 2016 Waves Above, recorder concerto
- 2014 Bright Blue Bird, In A Grey Red Sky for violin and orchestra
- 2014 Non Se Que Que Quen Za Za for string orchestra
- 1999 Into the Earth, oboe concerto

Choir

- 2023 Biome II SSAA female choir & percussion
- 2022 Biome SSAA female choir

Chamber music

- 2023 Psychological Song for mezzo-soprano & cello
- 2023 Three Words for mezzo-soprano & guitar (text by John Cage, Sohrab Sepehri, Edgard Allan Poe, M. Hosseini)
- 2021 Voices Today for soprano, mezzo soprano, saxophone, percussionist (drums, guitar, frame drum) & live electronics
- 2019 Run, Run for violin, clarinets, piano & percussions
- 2018 Pharmacy Suite for flute, clarinet, string trio & conductor
- 2018 Inferno for flute, clarinet, string trio & conductor (& optional video)
- 2018 Recycle for cello & percu
- 2015 Trance Dance Ritual for oboe & ensemble
- 2013 Taïraphone for saxophone & percussion
- 2013 Cold, Dry Wind for piano
- 2012 Zapp Music for guitar
- 2012 Rubaiyatfor mezzo-soprano and piano
- 2011 3 tangos for string quartet
- 2011 Mr & Mrs Saxophone for tenor saxophone
- 2011 Labyrinth of Moods for recorder, mezzo-sopran and percussion
- 2010 Coffee Time for three percussionists
- 2008 Four For Four for four cellos
- 2008 Working Timefor three percussionists
- 2007 Le Sonnet for organ
- 2006 Sonata for a Prisoner for violin
- 2006 Swedish Raga for bass clarinet, cello and drums
- 2006 Barock ’n’ Roll for eight instruments
- 2002 Taïraga for 13 instruments
- 2001 Esfand I for string quartet, didgeridoo and percussion
- 2000 Bones (fourth piece) for viola, piano, mezzo-soprano and synthesizer
- 1999 Âvâz for flute, bass clarinet and trumpet
- 1998 Bones (second piece) for cello and piano

Theatrical Music shows / Music Theater

- 2022 Dream of an Evil Child for animated photographies, live accordion, trumpet & electronics (50 min.)
- 2020 Labyrinths solo for dancer/musician, wheels & electronics (ca 50 min.)
- 2020 Opera In The Dark for film, live viola & electronics (ca 45 min.)
