= Ahmed Essyad =

Moroccan composer of classical music

Ahmed Essyad (born 1939 in Salé) is a Moroccan composer of classical music.

Born in Salé, he studied at the conservatory of Rabat. He moved to France in 1962, where he continued studies with Max Deutsch. Interested in ethnomusicology, he focuses his research on orality and notation, as well as on musical time and pulsation. His music blends Berber oral tradition, serial writing, and Gregorian and modal influences. Essyad has composed several operas, including L'eau for Radio France.

== Selected works ==
- Sultanes, electro-acoustic suite (1973)
- Identité, cantata (1975)
- Le collier des ruses (1977)
- L'eau, opera (1982)
- Le cycle de l'eau, for flutes and piano
- L'exercice de l'amour, light opera (1995)

== Awards ==
- Grand Prix national de la musique (1994)
