= Otaka prize =

Japanese music award

The Otaka prize (Japanese:尾高賞 Otaka-shō) is a prize annually awarded since 1952. It is named after the Japanese composer and conductor Hisatada Otaka, the prize is given to Japanese composers, and is awarded by the NHK Symphony Orchestra. Awardees include, Toshi Ichiyanagi, Shinichiro Ikebe, Toshiro Mayuzumi and the first woman awardee, Keiko Fujiie. The Otaka prize has been described as prestigious, and as the leading Japanese award.

== Winners ==
- 29th Prize: Tōru Takemitsu
- 51st Prize: Joji Yuasa
- 61st Prize: Ichiro Nodaira
- 62nd Prize: Toshirō Saruya and Toshio Hosokawa
- 63rd Prize: Dai Fujikura
- 64th Prize: Atsuhiko Gondai
- 65th Prize: Shin'ichirō Ikebe and Toshi Ichiyanagi
- 66th Prize: Naoki Sakata
- 67th Prize: Dai Fujikura
- 68th Prize: Toshio Hosokawa
- 69th Prize: Akira Nishimura and Malika Kishino
- 70th Prize: Toshi Ichiyanagi and Dai Fujikura
- 71st Prize: Joji Yuasa
- 72nd Prize: Atsuhiko Gondai
- 73rd Prize: Suguru Wagatsuma (我妻英)
