= Malika Kishino =

Japanese composer (born 1971)

- 岸野 末利加
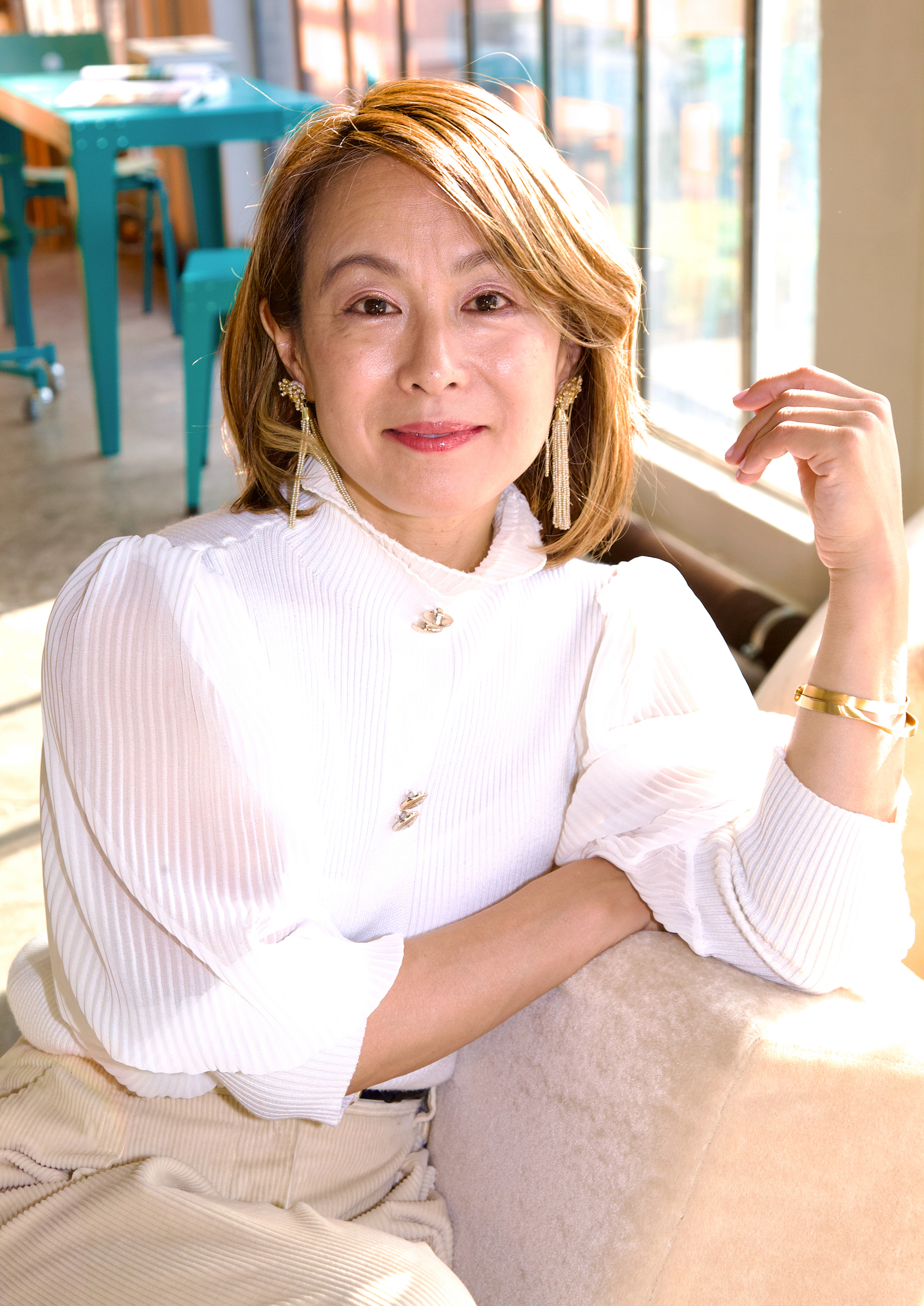
- Malika Kishino in 2023
- Born: July 16, 1971; Kyoto, Japan
- Occupation: composer
- Website: malika-kishino.com

Malika Kishino (Japanese: 岸野 末利加, Kishino Marika; born July 16, 1971) is a Japanese composer based in Cologne, Germany.

== Biography ==
Malika Kishino was born in Kyoto 1971. She studied law in Doshisha University then came to France in 1995 to study composition. She studied at École Normale de Musique de Paris with Yoshihisa Taira, at Conservatoire national supérieur de musique et de danse de Lyon with Robert Pascal and at the Institute for Research and Coordination Acoustic (IRCAM) with Philippe Leroux. She moved to Cologne in 2006. Her works are published by Edizioni Suvini Zerboni in Milan.

== Works ==
=== Vocal music ===
Music for choir

- Satsuki (May) (2000) for mixed choir, two trumpets, trombone and two percussionists
- Lo mes d’abrièu s’es en anat (April has gone...) (2005) for 12 female voices, children's choir and electronic sounds
- Ichimai-Kishohmon (2011) for mixed choir, voices of Buddhist priests, sho, hichiriki, 20 stringed koto, percussion, string trio
- Prayer / Inori (2011) for mixed choir
- Dialogue Invisible (2012) for 9 female voices
- Chant (2015) for orchestra and choir

Music with voice

- Battement (Schlag) (2003) for baritone and piano
- Hila – Hila to… (2009) for countertenor and 7 players
- Miraiken kara (from future sphere) (2012) for Noh-voice and alto flute

=== Choir and orchestra ===
- Chant (2015) for orchestra and choir

=== Orchestral ===
- Du Firmament (2001–02) for orchestra
- Fluxus ac Refluxus (2008) for large orchestra, divided into 7 groups
- Zur Tiefe (2013) for large orchestra

=== Concerto ===
- Himmelwärts II / Vers Le Ciel II (2007) for flute, percussions and 16 strings
- Rayons Crépusculaires (2007–08) for bass drum, large ensemble divided in 3 groups and 8 channel-live–electronic
- Concerto pour Koto (2013) for koto and orchestra
- Heliodor "Hymne für ein nicht existierendes Land" (2015) for trombone and large ensemble

=== Ensembles ===
- Danse du Zephyr (2002–03) for 17 players
- Sensitive Chaos (2010) for 7 players
- Stratus – Altocumulus – Cirrus (2014) for 9 players divided into 3 groups

=== Chamber ===
- Epure (1998–99) for string quartet
- Astral (2001) for flute, guitar, piano, violin and violoncello
- Scintillation (2002) for piano and cembalo
- Epanouissement II (2004) for bass flute
- Seventeen Steps (2006) for alto flute, violin, bass koto and piano
- Himmelwärts / Vers le ciel (2006) for flute, percussions, violin, viola and violoncello
- Himmelsleiter (2006) for alto flute, bass clarinet, trumpet, piano, violin and violoncello
- Himmelsleiter II (2006; 2013 rev.) for alto flute, bass clarinet, trumpet, harp, violin and violoncello
- Halo (2007) for two bass clarinets
- Erwachen (2007) for octo bass recorder, bass koto and percussion
- Erwachen II (2008) for bass flute, bass koto and percussion
- Vague de Passion (2010) for marimbaphone and vibraphone
- Monochromer Garten (2011) for accordion and violoncello
- Monochromer Garten II (2011) for bass clarinet, baritone saxophone and trombone
- Lamento (2013) – based on a folk song from Fukushima – for two violins
- Lamento II (2013; 2014 rev.) – based on a folk song from Fukushima – for violin and viola
- Monochromer Garten VII (2015) for recorder and percussion

=== Solo ===
- Danse automnale de feuilles vermeilles (1997) for piano
- Epanouissement (2003) for violoncello
- Koi Hanété… (2006) for piano. Based a haiku of Shiki Masaoka
- Monochromer Garten III (2011) for timpani
- Monochromer Garten IV (2012) for 30 stringed koto
- Monochromer Garten V (2013 for koto
- Monochromer Garten VI (2015) for viola

=== Series Monochromer Garten ===
- Monochromer Garten (2011) for accordion and violoncello
- Monochromer Garten II (2011) for bass clarinet, baritone saxophone and trombone
- Monochromer Garten III (2011) for timpani
- Monochromer Garten IV (2012) for 30 stringed koto
- Monochromer Garten V (2013 for koto
- Monochromer Garten VI (2015) for viola
- Monochromer Garten VII (2015) for recorder and percussion

=== Instrumental music with electronic ===
- Irisation Aquatique (2002) for bass clarinet, piano, violoncello and electronic sounds
- Eclosion (2005) for harp and 9 channel-live-electronic
- Lo mes d’abriéu s’es en anat (April has gone) (2005) for 12 female voices, children's choir and electronic sound
- Lebensfunke (2007) révision 2010 for bass drum and electronics
- Rayons Crépusculaires (2007–08) for bass drum, large ensemble divided in 3 groups and 8 channel-Live–Electronic
- Aqua vitae (2008) for two pianos, two (water-)percussions and 8 channel-live-electronic
- Qualia (2009) for bass koto and 10 channel-live-electronic
- Lebensfunke II (2010) for bass drum and 8 channel-live-electronic
