= Alfonso Gómez (disambiguation) =

Alfonso Gómez is a Mexican boxer.

Alfonso Gómez may also refer to:

- Alfonso Gómez-Lobo (1940–2011), professor of metaphysics
- Alfonso Gómez Méndez (born 1949), politician
- Alfonso Gomez-Rejon, television and film director
