= Keiko Fujiie =

Japanese composer (born 1963)

Keiko Fujiie (Japanese: 藤家渓子), born in 1963 in Kyoto, is a composer whose music is frequently performed both in Japan and internationally. She is best known for guitar compositions, many of them for the distinguished Japanese guitarist (also her husband) Kazuhito Yamashita, and organizes the guitar quintet that bears his name. She has twice won the Otaka Prize.

== Career ==
After graduating at the Tokyo National University of Fine Arts and Music, she completed her postgraduate studies at the same institution. Support from the Asian Cultural Council resulted in a residency in New York for several months in 1992/93, where she returned in 1998 to premiere In Their Shoes, a music and dance collaboration. From 1998/1999 she served as composer-in-residence for Orchestra Ensemble Kanazawa. Her commissions include Academic Festival Overture for the hundredth anniversary of Kyoto University, the double concerto Kyoto: Reverberation for the Kyoto Protocol Treaty in 1997, and Piano Concerto No. 1 "Memories of January" composed for the seventieth anniversary of the Japan Music Competition in 2001. Fujiie was asked to write the compulsory piece for participants in the Fifth Musashino-Tokyo International Organ Competition of 2004, and At the Tomb of Fra Angelico for organ and orchestra (also a commission) was composed to be performed by the winner of this same competition in 2006. Her Guitar Concerto No. 3 "Autumn Reverie" was premiered in Seoul, 2011.

== Kazuhito Yamashita Family Quintet ==
Since 2001, a major focus for Fujiie has been organizing the guitar quintet Kazuhito Yamashita Family Quintet, for which she also composes. Kasane is their main repertoire and typifies the music of a bygone era. This quintet seeks to revive the quintessential and older musical traditions of both Europe and Japan when such music was known and valued, and whose echoes can still be heard in the classic Japanese 11th century novel The Tale of Genji. In this piece, four guitars, multi-layering with shifting tonal colors, represent the various plucked stringed instruments of old Japan. Recent repertoire especially written for the quintet includes A Cantastoria of One Thousand and One Nights for five guitars, Suicho-Tsushimanoraku for three guitars, vocals and stones, and Morokoshi ni tsukawasu tsukai no fune Naniwa yori izuru toki haha ga ko ni okureru uta for vocal, five guitars and Japanese Bugaku dance. This last piece accords to the poetry sung by the mother of one of the members of a ship used on a Japanese mission to Tang dynasty China which departed in the year 733 AD. She composed this poetry on seeing her son off at Naniwa-kyō port, calling to a skein of cranes in the sky to ask to warm the traveler whenever there was a layer of frost on the field.

Fujiie has made three CDs with the Kazuhito Yamashita Family Quintet and has been invited along with them to many music festivals such as the Rome International Guitar Festival in 2004, the Cordoba Guitar Festival in 2007 and 2011, the Open Guitar Festival 2011 in the Czech Republic and others. Keiko also composes for orchestra and choir and has also written chamber music and opera. One area of interest is the Gagaku ancient court music in Japan, which she researches, also composing for this instrumental ensemble.

== Recognition ==
Fujiie was presented with the Kenzo Nakajima Award in 1996 for her monologue opera Nina de Cera. She is among the very few Japanese composers to have twice won the Otaka Prize awarded by the NHK Symphony Orchestra for the previous year's outstanding composition; in 1995 for Beber for orchestra and in 2000 for Guitar Concerto No. 2 Koisucho.

== Works ==
Fujiie is best known for guitar compositions, many of them for Japanese guitarist Kazuhito Yamashita. Selected works include:

- Bodrum Sea (Bodorumu no Umi)
- To Far-off Land (Kanata e)
- Now the Horizon Comes into View (Shoshite Suiheisen)
- The Night (Jyakuya)
- Dialogue with the Night (Yoru to no Katarai)
- La Casa (le)
- Piececitos (Kanashimi)
- Sweet Tenderness (Amai Yasashisa)
- Morning with Roosters
- Floating Paper Boats on the River
- Bicycling to the Wizard's Wood
- Raindrops Recolour the Landscape
- Fireworks in a Starry Sky
- Birds Peck-Pecking on Branches
- An Annamese Bowl with Leisurely Goldfish
- A Sad Melody at Twilight
- Daughter of the Mountain
- Children Chasing Birds
- New Year's Eve in a Far-Off Land
- Lullaby of the Waves
- Suite: In Their Shoes
- Sonata No. 1 for Solo Guitar, The Blue Flower
- Sakura, Sakura
- Barcarolle
- Cold Waves, Red Blood
- The Song of Shells, The Song of Stones
- Variations on Heidenröslein by Schubert
- Curious Interludes, on motifs by Namifu Yamashita, for guitar duo
- Kasane, for four guitars
- Cantastoria of One Thousand and One Nights, for five guitars
- Sceneries for Children with Korean and Japanese Melodies, for six guitars
- Suicho-Tsushimanoraku for three guitars, vocals and stones
- Morokoshi ni tsukawasu tsukai no fune Naniwa yori izuru toki haha ga ko ni okureru uta Op. 98, for vocal, 5 guitars and Japanese Bugaku dance
- Guitar Concerto No. 1
- Guitar Concerto No. 2 – Koisucho
- Kyoto; Reverberation, for doublebass, guitar and orchestra
- An Autumn Reverie, for guitar and string ensemble

Her works have been recorded and issued on CD, including:

- La Casa (works for solo guitar) Audio CD (December 1, 1997) Solea Group/Sugo Music courtesy of Yamashita Kazuhito Jimusho Co., Ltd., ASIN: B002NILJZC
- Little Girls' Beautiful Lives SOLEA Group
