= Kazuhito Yamashita =

Japanese guitarist (1961–2026)

- Born: March 25, 1961; Nagasaki, Japan
- Died: January 24, 2026 (aged 64)
- Occupation: Classical guitarist

Kazuhito Yamashita (山下 和仁, Yamashita Kazuhito) (25 March 1961 – 24 January 2026) was a Japanese classical guitarist and husband of the composer Keiko Fujiie. His technique and expression are highly acclaimed. By the age of 32, Yamashita had already released 52 albums, including repertoires for solo guitar, guitar concertos, chamber music and collaborations with other renowned musicians such as James Galway and Larry Coryell. He released a total of 83 albums.

== Life and career ==
Yamashita began to study the guitar at the age of eight with his father, Toru Yamashita. In 1972, aged eleven, he won the Kyushu Guitar Competition. Four years later, he was awarded First Prize in the All Japan Guitar Competition. In 1977, he won three important international competitions - the Ramirez in Spain, the Alessandria in Italy and Paris Radio France Competition, being the youngest winner ever recorded.

In 1978, Yamashita made his debut in Japan and, in the following year, traveled to Europe. While still in his twenties, he made his first appearances in Canada's Toronto International Guitar Festival and gave a solo recital in the Musikverein (Grosser Saal) in Vienna, he also performed in the US and UK. He gave solo recitals in concert halls around the world including Lincoln Center, Chicago Symphony Center Orchestra Hall, Teatro Olimpico, St. Petersburg Philharmonia Grand Hall, and has performed with a variety of orchestras and conductors in Europe, North America and Asia. In 1989, the Casals Hall in Tokyo, considered to be one of the finest auditoriums in the world, presented a series called The World of Kazuhito Yamashita, comprising seven concerts in 12 months. The high point of the concerts was Castelnuovo-Tedesco's 24 Caprichos de Goya in a single performance. The series concluded with Bach's six sonatas and partitas over two consecutive nights; a recital series was continued in 1994 and 1999.

In addition to solo performances, Yamashita also played duets, as well as with chamber music ensembles, orchestras and internationally acclaimed artists, such as Leonard Slatkin with the London Philharmonic Orchestra, Rafael Frühbeck de Burgos, Antoni Ros Marbà, Garcia Navarro, Pedro Halffter, Hiroyuki Iwaki, NHK Symphony Orchestra, Los Angeles Chamber Orchestra, Orquesta de la RTVE, Claudio Scimone e I Solisti Veneti, James Galway (flute), Gary Karr (double bass), Michala Petri (recorder), The Tokyo String Quartet etc. In the 4th Santo Tirso International Guitar Festival, held in 1997, he played four guitar concertos in one night with the Cordoba orchestra, conducted by Leo Brouwer. He was active in the guitar quartet Kazuhito Yamashita + Bambini. This quartet, consisting of Yamashita and his children, performed at two international festivals in Italy, the Seoul Art Center in Korea, Portugal, Cordoba Festival in Spain, San Francisco Herbst Theatre and several cities throughout Japan.

He made a total of 83 recordings and numerous original arrangements of such works as Mussorgsky's Pictures at an Exhibition, Stravinsky's Firebird, Rimsky-Korsakov's Scheherazade and Dvořák's Symphony from the New World. He has recorded for BMG (RCA), Crown Classics, Japan Victor, King Records and Alfa Records. His recordings include 16 CDs with the complete works of Fernando Sor, and a collection of 5 CDs containing J.S. Bach's sonatas and partitas for violin, cello, lute and flute (BWV 995–1013), all which he himself transcribed for the guitar. His recording of Mussorgsky's Pictures at an Exhibition, released in 1981, was awarded the Deutsches Grammophon Award. His transcriptions of orchestral and virtuosic piano music is also considered by some as controversial.

Yamashita was an enthusiastic proponent of new works for the guitar and gave the world premiere of more than 60 new compositions. In this regard, his world premiere and presentation of the works of the Japanese composer Keiko Fujiie, his wife, is notable. In 1999, he received the National Arts Festival Grand Prize from the Japanese Government's Agency for Cultural Affairs for his CD recording of Japanese Guitar Music 1923-1948.

His early arrangements of Pictures at an Exhibition, Stravinsky's Firebird Suite, Dvořák's New World Symphony no. 9 in E Minor, and others, broke boundaries in terms of solo guitar expression and virtuosity.

In 2004 "Kazuhito Yamashita + bambini" was founded by Kazuhito, his two daughters and elder son, to look to the risorgimento of a quintessential and older musical tradition. This recalls a bygone era of both the East and the West when such music was known and valued and whose echoes can still be heard in the classic 11th century novel "The Tale of Genji." In 2010, his younger son joined them and they were renamed "Kazuhito Yamashita Family Guitar Quintet." They have already appeared in festivals in Italy, Cordoba festival in Spain in 2007 and 2011, and have also performed in Portugal, Korea, Vietnam, Singapore, Japan and United States.

Yamashita died on 24 January 2026, at the age of 64.

== Discography ==
1. Romance De Amor (Apr.1978) [RVC]RDC-8, [Sony]BVCC-35128

2. Nocturnal (Aug.1978) [JVC]VDC-1220

3. Concerto de Aranjuez (Apr.1979 [RVC]RVC-2280, [Sony]BVCC-35129

4. La Catedral (Apr.1980) [JVC]VDC-1221

5. Bach: Partita No.2 BWV1004 & Suite No.6 BWV1012 (May.1980) [BMG]BVCC-2503

6. Pictures at an Exhibition (Moussorgsky / arr. Yamashita) (Mar.1981) [BMG]RCCD-1021, RCD14203 [Sony]BVCC-37291

7. Music of Spain (Jan.1982) [RVC]RCL-8301 [BMG]5913-2-RC, [Sony]BVCC-35130

8. Beethoven: Concerto in D major for guitar & orchestra op.61 (Mar.1982) [RVC]R32C-1014

9. Takemitsu, Watanabe, Yoshimatsu and Noda (Jun.1982) [ALFA]ALR-28038 [Sony]BVCC-35132

10. Kazuhito & Naoko Yamashita Guitar Duo No.1 (Aug.1982)[RVC]RCL-8348

11. Virtuoso Guitar (Mar.1983)[RVC]RCL-8370

12. Sonatas by Turina, Berkeley, Ponce and Torroba (Jul.1983) [RVC]RCL-8379

13. Kazuhito & Naoko Yamashita Guitar Duo No.2 (Sep.1983) [RVC]RCL-8386

14. Colectici Intim (Apr.1984)[RVC]RCL-8398, [Sony]BVCC-35131

15. The Four Seasons by Vivardi -- Yamashita & Larry Coryell (Sep.1984) [RVC]RJCD-107, [Sony]BVCJ-35033

16. Kazuhito & Naoko Yamashita Guitar Duo No.3 (Aug.1984) [RVC]RCL-8409

17. Giuliani, Vivaldi and Carulli played with Chamber orchestra of Leos Janacek (Nov.1984)[RVC]RCCD-1038 [BMG]5914-2-RC

18. Stravinsky: The Firebird (Apr.1985) [RVC]RCCD-1070

19. Rimsky-Korsakov: Scheherazade - duo with Naoko Yamashita (Jun.1985) [RVC]RCCD-1071 [Sony]BVCC-35133

20. Tansman & Ponce (Jan.1986)[RVC]R32C-1032

21. Pegasus Effect - Tadaaki Otaka (con.), Tokyo philharmonic orch (Apr.1986) [BMG]BVCC-2524

22. Italian Serenade — James Galway & Kazuhito Yamashita (Jun.1986)[BMG]R32C-1061,5679-2-RC

23. Concerto de Aranjuez - Orchestre de chambre Jean-Francois Paillard (Jul.1986) [BMG]BVCC-2526 [Sony]BVCC-37279

24. Dvorak : Symphony No.9 "From The New World (Jun.1987) [KING]KICC-60, [BMG]7929-2-RC

25. Villa-Lobos: 5 Preludes & 12 Etudes (Apr.1987) [RVC]R32C-1116

26-41. [16CDs] Fernando Sor Complete Works for Guitar (16CDs)(1987)[JVC]VDC-14-29

42-43. [2CDs] J.S.Bach: Six Sonatas and Partitas for Solo Violin BWV1001-6 [Complete](Aug.1989) [CROWN]CRCC-7001&2, CRCC-8001&2

44. C-Tedesco: "24 Caprichos de Goya" (Aug.1989) [CROWN] CRCC-6, CRCC-8006

45. C-Tedesco: 3 Guitar Concertos with Leonard Slatkin (Con), London po. (Aug.1989) [BMG]BVCC-23, 60355-2-RC, [Sony]BVCC-35134

46-47 [2CDs]. J.S.Bach: Six Suites for Solo Cello BWV1007-12 (Aug.1990) [CROWN]CRCC-3&4, CRCC-8003&4

48. Kazuhito Yamashita plays his Favorites (23 pieces) (June 1991) [CROWN]CRCC-8, CRCC-20001, CRCC-8007

49. C-Tedesco and Boccherini Quintets - Tokyo String Quartet (Feb.1990) [BMG]BVCC-59, 60421-2-RC, [Sony]BVCC-35135

50. Mozart Opera Arias / Kazuhito & Naoko Yamashita Guitar Duo (Aug.1991) [CROWN]CRCC-10, CRCC-8008

51. J.S.Bach : Lute Suites and Flute Partita (Sep.1991) [CROWN]CRCC-12, CRCC-8005

52. J. Galway, K. Yamashita, J. Swensen play Giuliani (1988–89)[BMG]BVCC-115 [Sony]BVCC-35136

53–54. [2CDs] C-Tedesco: Platero y Yo - Teresa J.Berganza (Oct.1993) [CROWN]CRCC-7010&7011

55. Villa-Lobos: 5 Preludes & 12 Etudes (Feb.1994) [Sony]BVCC-666

56. Yamashita and Claudio Scimone & I SOLISTI VENETI plays Giuliani and Vivaldi (April 1994) [Sony]BVCC-692

57. Takashi Yoshimatsu (June 1994)[BMG]BVCC-673

58. François de Fossa (June 1995) [BMG]BVCC-719

59. Ponce : 5 Sonatas (December 1995) [BMG]BVCC-735

60. Alexandre Tansman (March 1996) [BMG]BVCC-747

61. Keiko Fujiie (December 1996) [brinrinri]KYBR-9701

62. Fandanguillo / Spanish Recital (February 1997) [Sony]BVCC-772

63. Kazuhito Yamashita plays his Favorites 2 (26 pieces) (December 1998) [CROWN]CRCC-29

64. Japanese Guitar Music 1923-1948 (December 1998) [CROWN]CRCC-31

65–66. [2CDs] Hey Jude - Yesterday (Recorded October 1999-Released January 21, 2000) [CROWN]CRCC-7012-3

67. Mario Castelnuovo-Tedesco (June 2001) [CROWN]CRCC-32

68. Tippett, Walton, Britten and Takemitsu (June 2001) [CROWN]CRCC-33

69. Japanese Guitar Music Vol. 2 (December 2001) [CROWN]CRCC-34

70. J.S.Bach : Jesu, Joy Of Man's Desiring (April 2003) [CROWN]CRCC-36

71. Keiko Fujiie (May 2004) [Sony]BVCC-31081

72–73. [2CDs] J.S. Bach: Six Sonatas and Partitas for Solo Violin BWV1001-6 (Oct. 2004) [Sony]BVCC-34115-6

74. Rediscovered 1979 Recording, Invocation et dance (Rodrigo), Passacalia (Roncalli), Fandanguillo (Turina), Homenaje a la guitarra (Sainz de la Maza), Scherzino Mexicano (Ponce), Fandango (Rodrigo) Rec. - April & Sept.1979 [Sony]BVCC-35137

75. Amazing Grace (January 2006)[CROWN]CRCC-37

76. Little Girls’ Beautiful Lives / Koyumi + Kazuhito Yamashita (September 2005) [brinriniri] KYBR-0701

77. Kasane - Yamashita family (July 2005 and May 2007) [brinrinri]KRBR-0702

78. Little Henny Penny - Yamashita family (2005, 2008) [brinrinri] KYBR-0801

79. Fernando Sor (2009) [brinrinri] KYBR-1010

80. Kazuhito and Koyumi Yamashita Guitar Duo (Sor, Granados, Villa-Lobos, Vivaldi, Falla, Leonhard von Call, Anónimo, Daragh Black Hynes) (2017) [brinrinri] KYBR-1701

81. Fernando Sor Etudes Anthology Vol.1 [brinrinri] KYBR-1703

82. Fernando Sor Etudes Anthology Vol.2 [brinrinri] KYBR-1704

83. Fernando Sor Etudes Anthology Vol.3 [brinrinri] KYBR-1705
