= Yves-Marie Pasquet =

French composer

Yves-Marie Pasquet (born 1947 in Orléans) is a French composer of contemporary music, former teacher at the Sorbonne and in conservatories.
