= Toronto International Guitar Festival =

The Toronto International Guitar Festival was a triennial guitar festival that took place between 1975 and 1987 in Toronto, Canada. It was founded by Eli Kassner and was the subject of Guitar, a 1988 film from Rhombus Media.

The festival grew out of discussions Kassner had with members of the Guitar Society of Toronto. The first festival, Guitar '75, attracted some 500 guitar teachers, students, composers, luthiers, and aficionados. Performers included Carlos Barbosa-Lima, Leo Brouwer, Oscar Ghiglia, Alirio Diaz, and the duo of Ako Ito and Henry Dorigny. The festival's competition winners were Sharon Isbin, Manuel Barrueco, David Leisner, and Eliot Fisk.

Major guitar works premiered at the festival included R. Murray Schafer's Le Cri de Merlin and Leo Brouwer's Toronto Concerto, the latter with John Williams as soloist and Brouwer himself conducting.

The Canadian classical guitarist Dr. Christopher Boston, wrote his treatise on the festival, it is entitled "Canadian Works Written For The Toronto International Guitar Festival".
