= Shin-Ichi Fukuda =

Japanese guitarist (born 1955)

Shin-Ichi Fukuda (福田 進一, Fukuda Shin'ichi; born in Osaka, Japan on December 25, 1955) is a Japanese classical guitarist. He has released more than 60 albums, including in Memoriam: Takemitsu: Guitar Works, his interpretation of works by the Japanese composer Toru Takemitsu. Shin-ichi Fukuda Official Website

== See also ==
- Toru Takemitsu
- Sergio Assad
- Leo Brouwer
