= Kiyoko Suizenji =

Kiyoko Suizenji 水前寺 清子
- Born: Tamiko Hayashida; October 9, 1945 (age 80); Kokai Shōten Street, Chūō-ku, Kumamoto, Kumamoto Prefecture, Japan
- Genres: Enka, kayōkyoku
- Occupations: Singer, actress
- Instrument: Vocals
- Years active: October 15, 1964 – present
- Labels: Nippon Crown (1964–1980; 1989); BMG Victor (1981–1988)
- Website: Official website

Tamiko Hayashida (林田 民子, Hayashida Tamiko; born 1945), better known as Kiyoko Suizenji (水前寺 清子, Suizenji Kiyoko), is a Japanese enka singer and actress represented by Suisei Kikaku.

== Discography (singles) ==
Year	Title	Notes
1964	"Namida o Daita Wataridori"	
1966	"Ippon Dokko no Uta"	
1967	"Itsu Demo Kimi wa"	
1968	"San hyaku roku jū go ho no māchi"	Sang briefly by Mari Makinami Illustrious (played by Maaya Sakamoto) in Evangelion: 2.0 You Can (Not) Advance.
1971	"Odon ga Kuni wa"	
1972	"Shōwa Hōrō-ki"	
1975	"Maya the Honey Bee"	
1993	"Dosukoi!! Tarō"	

== Discography (albums) ==
=== Original albums ===
Year	Title	Notes
1968	Omoide no Gunka o Utau	
1968	Mugi to Heitai: Kiyoko Suizenji Senji Kayō o Utau Aikan no Senji Kayō-shū	
1969	Senyū: Kiyoko Suizenji Aishū no Gunka o Utau	
1970	Ōtone Zukiyo: Kiyoko Suizenji Chimata no Uta Best 12	
1971	Nen Gara Komori-uta: Kiyoko Suizenji Kokoro no Furusato o Utau	
1972	Ohikae Nasu Tte! Cheetah desu: Kiyoko Suizenji Ninkyō Kayō o Utau	
1974	Toki wa Nagareru	
1978	Matatabi	
1981	Tsurezure Utamakura	
1984	Ya! Cheetah	
1988	Cheetah no Kamona My House	
1994	Kiyoko Suizenji Kashu Seikatsu 30-shūnen Tokubetsu Kikaku Arigatō 30-nen	

=== Live albums ===
Year	Title	Notes
1970	Subarashī Bōken Cheetah! Suizenji Kiyoko Live In Tokyo	
1982	Kiyoko Suizenji Recital: Enkajinsei Ōen Uta	

=== Best albums ===
Year	Title	Notes
1967	Naitewaratte Hitori Tabi: Anata o Yusaburu Cheetah no Koe	
1968	Kiyoko Suizenji Golden Hit: "Namida o Daita Wataridori" Kara "Enka" Made	
1977	Jinsei no Ōen Uta	
2013	Golden Best Kiyoko Suizenji RCA Years	
2013	Kiyoko Suizenji no Sekai	

== Filmography ==
=== NHK Kōhaku Uta Gassen ===
Year / No.	No. of times	Song	Order of appearance	Opponent	Remarks
1965 / 16th	1st	"Namida o Daita Wataridori"	20/25	Hideo Murata (1st)	
1966 / 17th	2nd	"Ippon Dokko no Uta"	20/25	Hideo Murata (2nd)	
1967 / 18th	3rd	"Dōdō Dokko no Uta"	1/23	Kazuo Funaki	Top batter (1st)
1968 / 19th	4th	"Otoko de Yoisho"	21/23	Kyu Sakamoto	Red Team Emcee
1969 / 20th	5th	"Shinjitsu Ichiro no March"	7/23	Akira Mita	
1970 / 21st	6th	"Dai Shōbu"	1/24	Hideo Murata (3)	Top batter (2nd)
1971 / 22nd	7th	"Ā Otokonara Otokonara"	24/25	Hiroshi Mizusawa	Tori mae (1st), Red Team Emcee (2nd)
1972 / 23rd	8th	"Shōwa Hōrō-ki"	22/23	Akira Fuse	Tori mae (2nd)
1973 / 24th	9th	"Ippon Dokko no Uta" (2nd time)	19/22	Haruo Minami (1st)	Red Team Emcee (3rd)
1974 / 25th	10th	"Teppen Ma-gokoro"	14/25	Saburō Kitajima	
1975 / 26th	11th	"Dai Shōbu" (2nd time)	10/24	Hideo Murata (4th)	
1976 / 27th	12th	"Kimen-ji"	16/24	Hideo Murata (5th)	
1977 / 28th	13th	"Kokū Taiko"	14/24	Saburō Kitajima (2nd)	
1978 / 29th	14th	"Higo no Komageta"	14/24	Frank Nagai	
1979 / 30th	15th	"Namida o Daita Wataridori" (2nd time)	15/23	Haruo Minami (2nd)	Red Team Emcee (4th)
1980 / 31st	16th	"San Byaku Rokujūgoho no March"	19/23	Haruo Minami (3rd)	
1981 / 32nd	17th	"Ariake no Umi"	6/22	Haruo Minami (4th)	
1982 / 33rd	18th	"Dai Shōbu" (3rd time)	6/22	Haruo Minami (5th)	
1983 / 34th	19th	"Asakusa Monogatari"	21/21	Takashi Hosokawa (1st)	Tori
1984 / 35th	20th	"Naniwabushida yo Jinsei wa"	9/20	Takashi Hosokawa (2nd)	
1985 / 36th	21st	"Jinsei Yume Shamisen"	15/20	Takashi Hosokawa (3rd)	
1986 / 37th	22nd	"Otoko San Byaku Roku Jū-do"	15/20	The Checkers	

=== Drama ===
Year	Title	Role	Network	Notes
1969	Ten to Chi to	Yae	NHK	
1970	Arigatō	Hikaru Yomo, Shin Furuyama, Ai Shimura	TBS	Lead role
1971	Onna to Misoshiru		TBS	Episode 18
1971	Tenka Gomen		NHK	Narration
1972	Seishun o Tsuppashire	Kiyoko Mizumachi	Fuji TV	Episode 16
1974	Hōnen Mansaku		Fuji TV	Lead role
1974	Tōkaidō Nē-chan Jingi		Fuji TV	Lead role
1975	Ashita ga Gozaru	世渡集子	TBS	
1976	Baketan Kazoku		TV Asahi	
1976	Ōedo Sōsamō	Okiyo	TV Tokyo	Episode 269
1979	Zenigata Heiji		Fuji TV	Episode 691
1984	Abarenbō Shōgun II	Okei	TV Asahi	Episode 43
1985	Hissatsu Shigoto Jini Gaiden Mondo, Dai Nana Kiheitai to Tatakau Ōtone Western Tsukiyo	Oshika/Yellow Deere	ABC	
1986	Kokoro wa Lonely, Kimochi wa "..." IV		Fuji TV	
1987	Manga-dō: Seishun-hen	Terue Suga	NHK	
1999	Kyōshūjo Monogatari	Miyuki Takanashi	TBS	
2002	Hōigaku Kyōshitsu no Jiken File	Yumiko Nakane	TV Asahi	
2003	Okā-san to Issho	Yoshie Aramaki	Fuji TV	
2003	Victory! Foot Girls no Seishun		Fuji TV	
2005	Keisatsuchō Naitei Kansatsu-kan Aoi Sakurazawa no Jiken-bo	Aoi Sakurazawa	TBS	Lead role
2005	Kagai Jugyō Yōkoso-senpai		NHK	
2007	Oishinbo		Fuji TV	
2008	Shin Kyōto Meikyū Annai 5	Ritsuko Satake	TV Asahi	Series 10 Episode 1; Guest
2009	Mito Kōmon	Noriyo	TBS	Episode 6
2013	Sazae-san		Fuji TV	Special appearance
2013	Senryoku-gai Sōsa-kan	Sueko Kitasato	NTV	Episode 7

=== TV series ===
Year	Title	Network	Notes	Ref.
	Yoru no Hit Studio	Fuji TV		
	NTV Kōhaku Uta no Best Ten	NTV	Akagumi Shodai captain	
	Kyūshū Doyō Present	NHK		
	Cheetah 55-gō	TBS		
1977	Tobe! Songokū	TBS	Voice	
1996	Wide!Scramble	TV Asahi	Main presenter	
	BS Fureai Stage	NHK BS2	Moderator	
	Shibuya Raibu Stage	NHK BS2	Moderator	
	Shōwa Kayō Taizenshū	TV Tokyo	Moderator	
2016	Do You Saturday?	BS Fuji		

== Honours ==
- Order of the Rising Sun, 4th Class, Gold Rays with Rosette (2019)
