= Tōchūken Kumoemon =

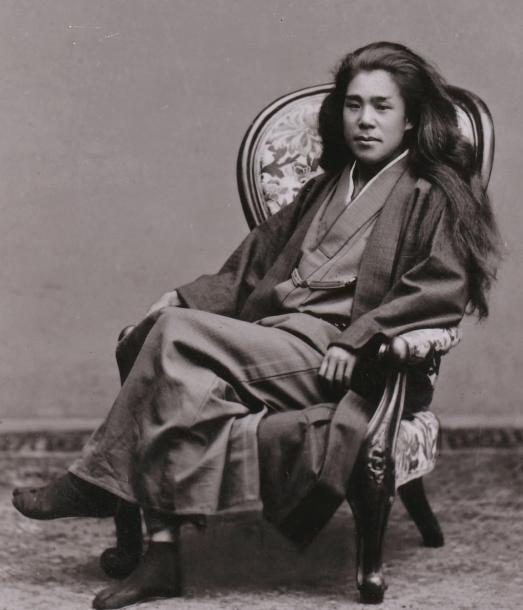
Tōchūken Kumoemon

Tōchūken Kumoemon (桃中軒 雲右衛門) (October 25, 1873 – November 7, 1916) was a popular rōkyoku recitalist in Meiji Japan. His immense popularity helped rōkyoku break into the mainstream. At his height, he performed Chūshingura productions to sell-out crowds at some of the biggest theatres in Tokyo and Osaka. These performances also roused nationalist sentiment during Russo-Japanese War.

Tōchūken's style of reciting left a lasting impression on rōkyoku, and indirectly also on enka, especially the music of Haruo Minami and Hideo Murata. Tōchūken was a contemporary of legendary musician-activist Soeda Azenbō.

Mikio Naruse made a biopic about him in 1936.

== See also ==
- Music of Japan
- Tochuken Kumoemon (1936) at IMDb
- Yoshida Naramaru
