= List of best-selling music artists in Japan =

The top music artists in Japan include Japanese artists with claims of 15 million or more record sales or with over 2 million subscribers. Japan is the largest physical music market in the world and the second largest overall behind the United States, and the biggest in Asia, according to International Federation of the Phonographic Industry.

Sources that provide the sales an artist or record company claim via press release, rather than certified or reported by reliable third parties such as Oricon, are denoted by a "†".

== Oricon Charts ==
Oricon provides accumulated physical sales of all entries on its singles and albums charts (started in 1968 and 1970, respectively). Note that Oricon does not count sales of the records that did not enter or fell off of the charts, unlike Nielsen SoundScan. Therefore, it generally shows fewer numbers than reported sales via record labels, and may not reflect the real sales obtained by these artists. In addition, it excludes recording artists like Michiya Mihashi, Hibari Misora, Yujiro Ishihara, and Hachiro Kasuga who had garnered most of their commercial success before Oricon was established in the late 1960s. The reported numbers like Mihashi's 100 million and Misora's 68 million records, are highly doubtful and cannot be confirmed by Oricon and RIAJ.

The best-selling artist according to Oricon are B'z (more than 86 million), who is also the best-selling artist by a number of albums sold (46.5 million). The best-selling artists by number of singles sold are AKB48 (73 million), B'z (35.8 million) in second place, Mr. Children (28.45 million) in third place, and Southern All Stars (25.179 million) in fourth place. Ayumi Hamasaki holds the record for being the best-selling solo artist and being the only solo artist to sell more than 50 million in total.

The list excludes sales of albums or singles recorded by artists in collaboration with others as part of a singular artist or group's total.

== Artists by sales ==
=== 50 million or more records ===
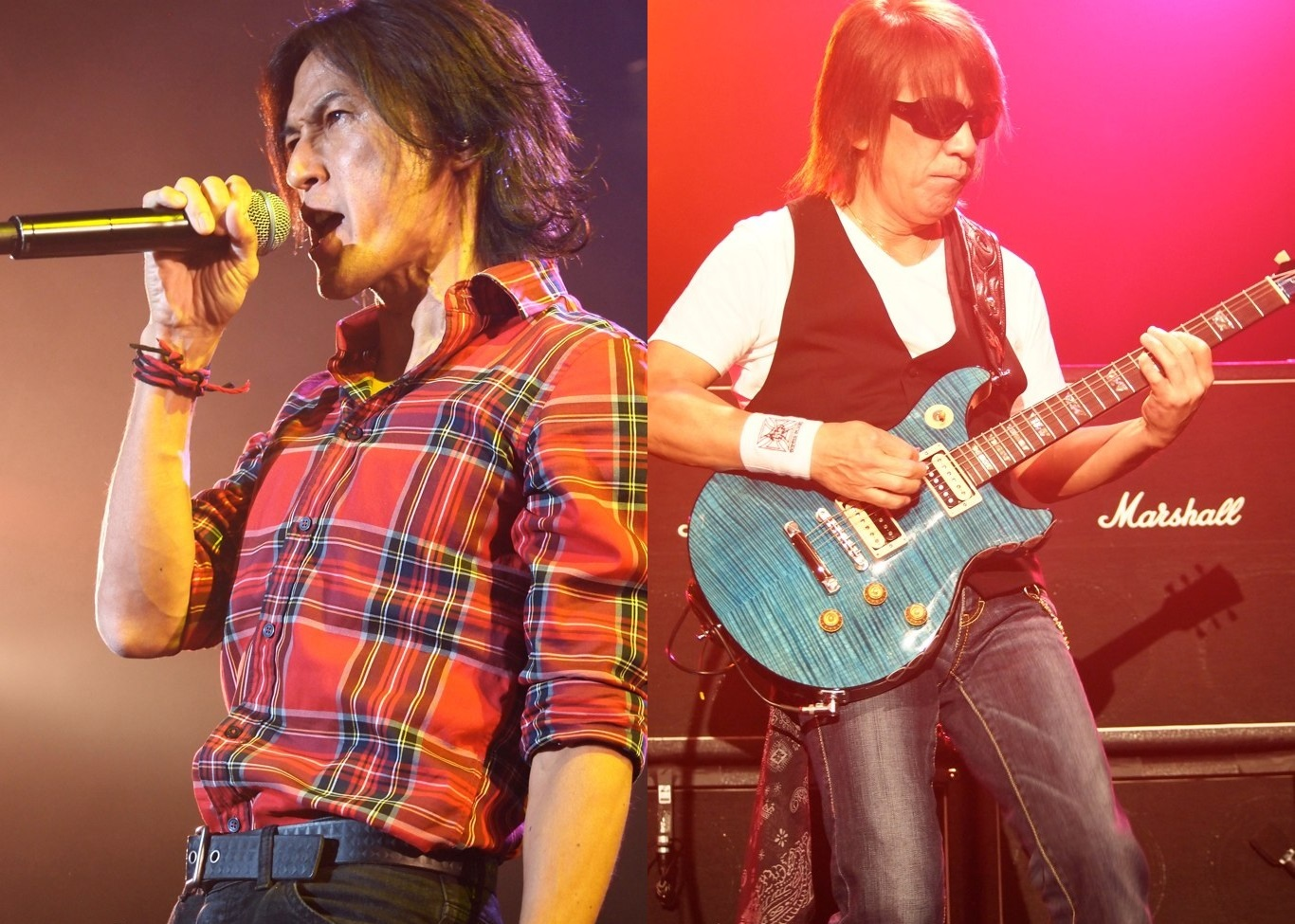
B'z

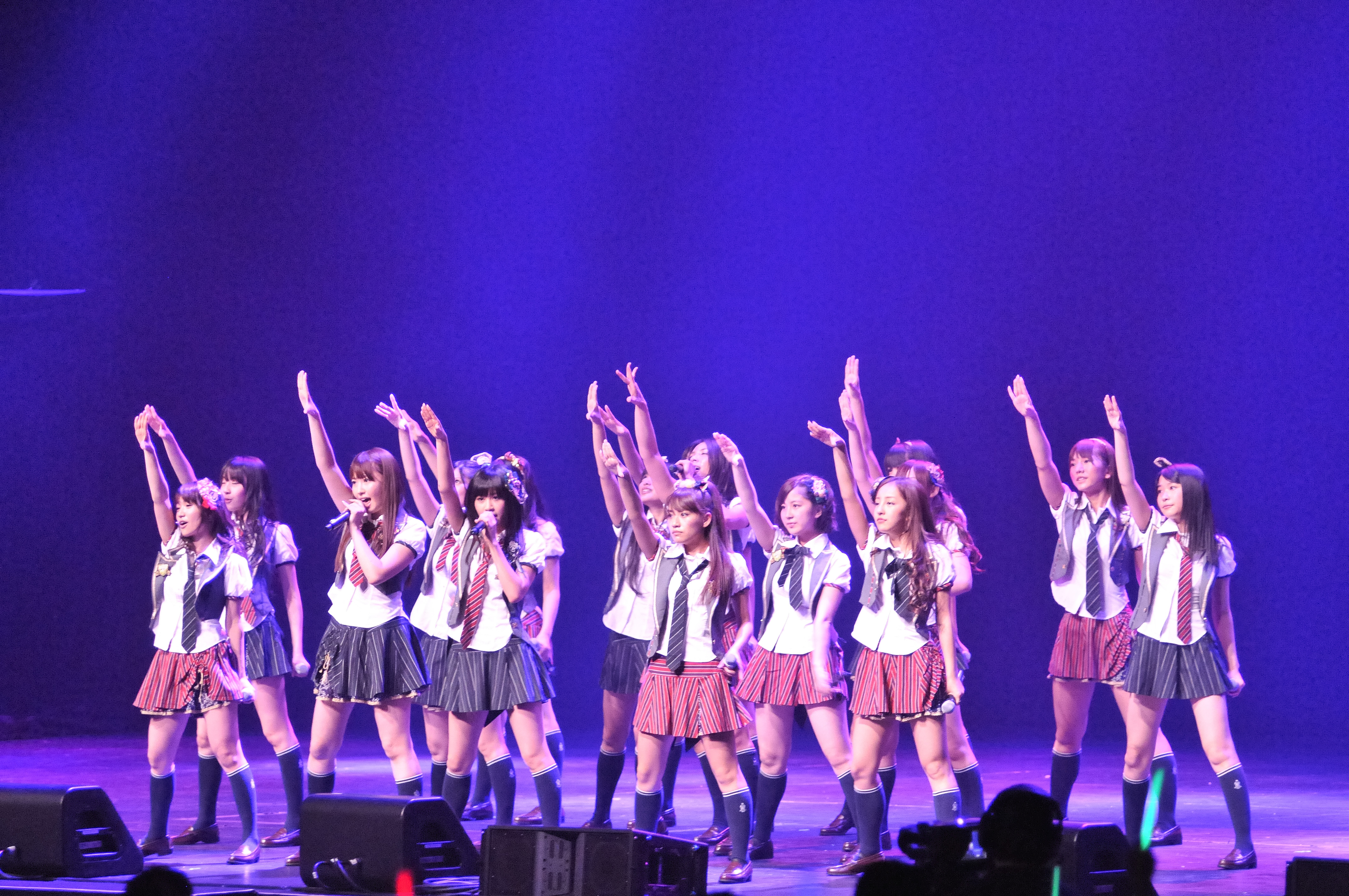
AKB48

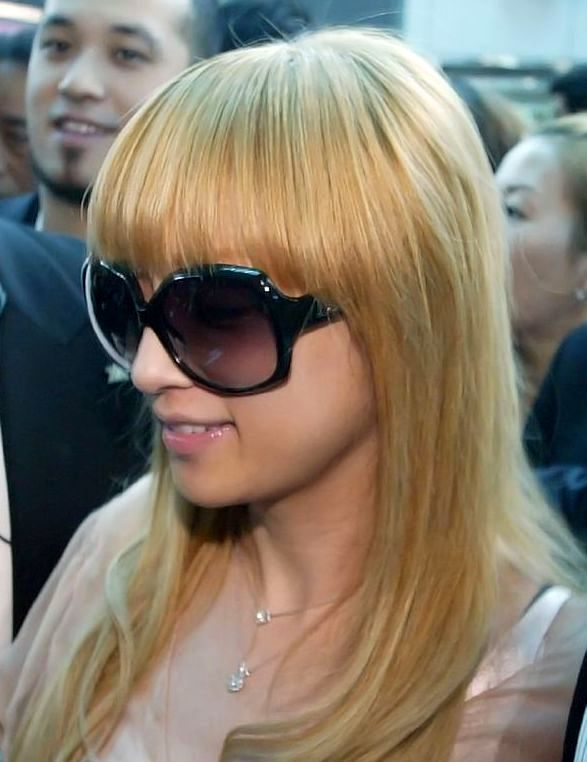
Ayumi Hamasaki

Artist	Years active	Genre	Sales
B'z	1988–present	Hard rock / Pop rock / Blues rock	86.25 million
AKB48	2005–present	J-pop / Electropop / Dance-pop	73.4 million
Mr. Children	1989–1997, 1998–present	Pop rock / Power pop / Progressive pop	60.01 million
Ayumi Hamasaki	1998–present	Pop / Dance / Electronic / Rock	50.708 million

=== 40 million to 49 million records ===
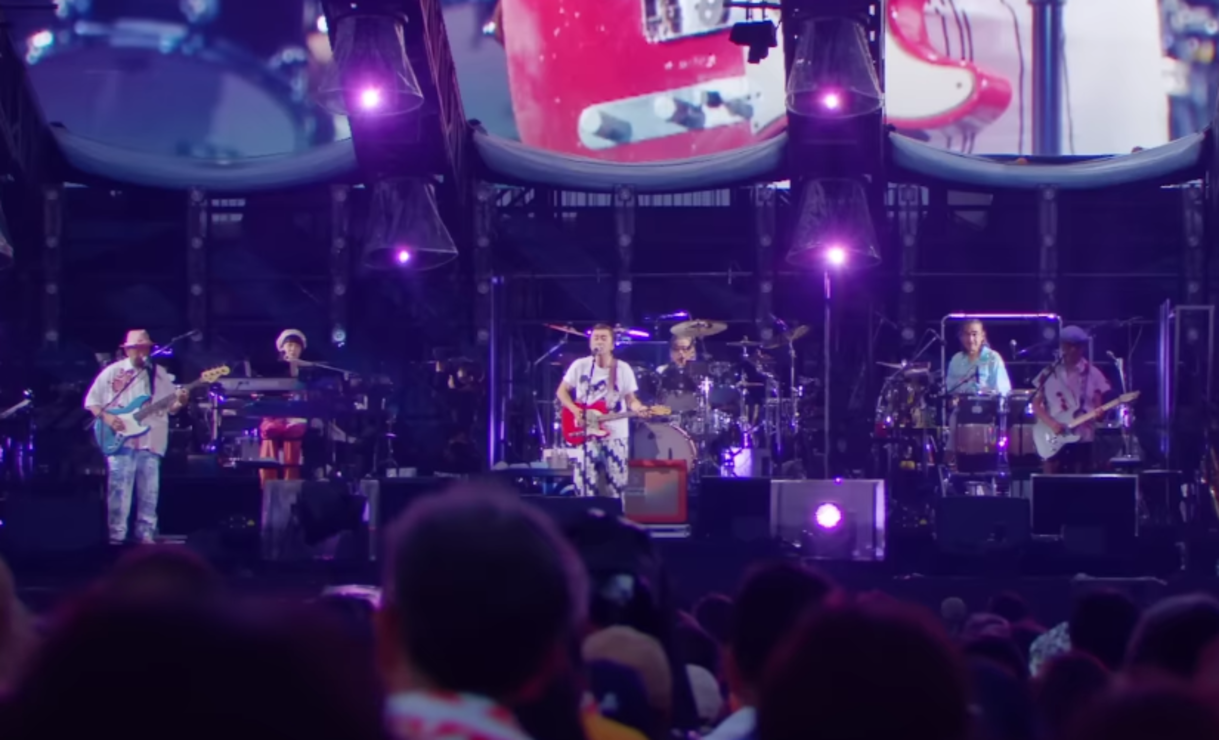
Southern All Stars

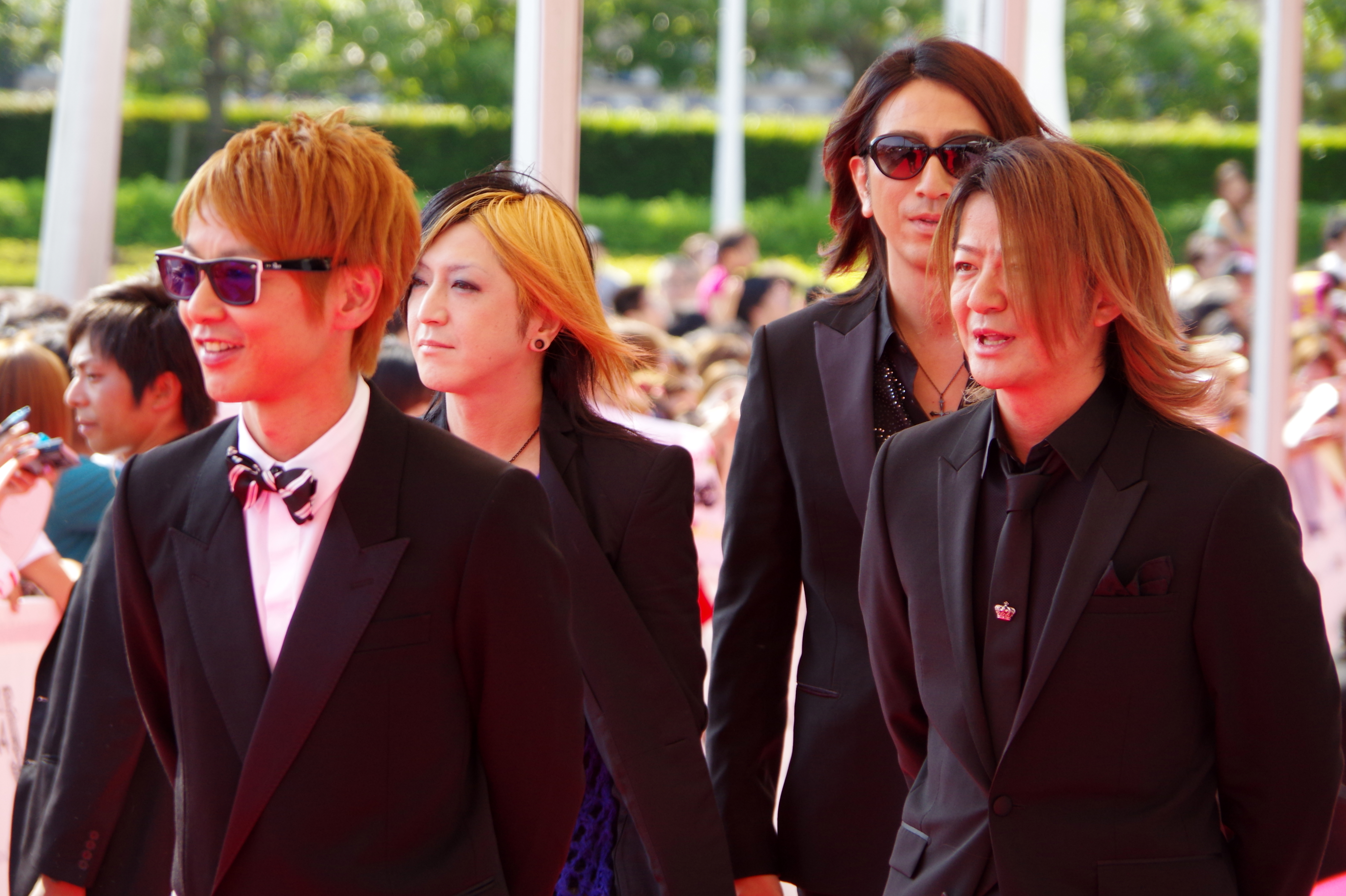
GLAY

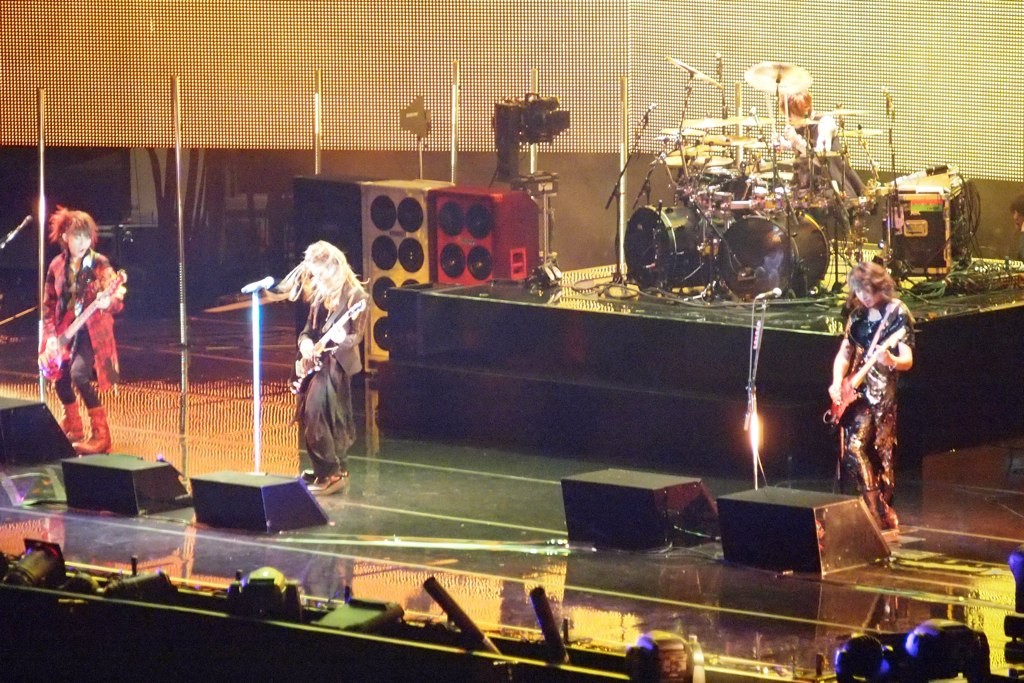
L'Arc-en-Ciel

Artist	Years active	Genre	Sales
Southern All Stars	1975–present	Soft rock / Pop rock / Folk rock / Blues rock	48.8 million
Dreams Come True	1988–present	J-pop / R&B / New wave / City pop	44.94 million
Glay	1988–present	Pop rock / Power pop / Progressive rock	40 million†
L'Arc-en-Ciel	1991-present	Alternative Rock / Pop Rock / Post-punk	40 million†

=== 30 million to 39 million records ===
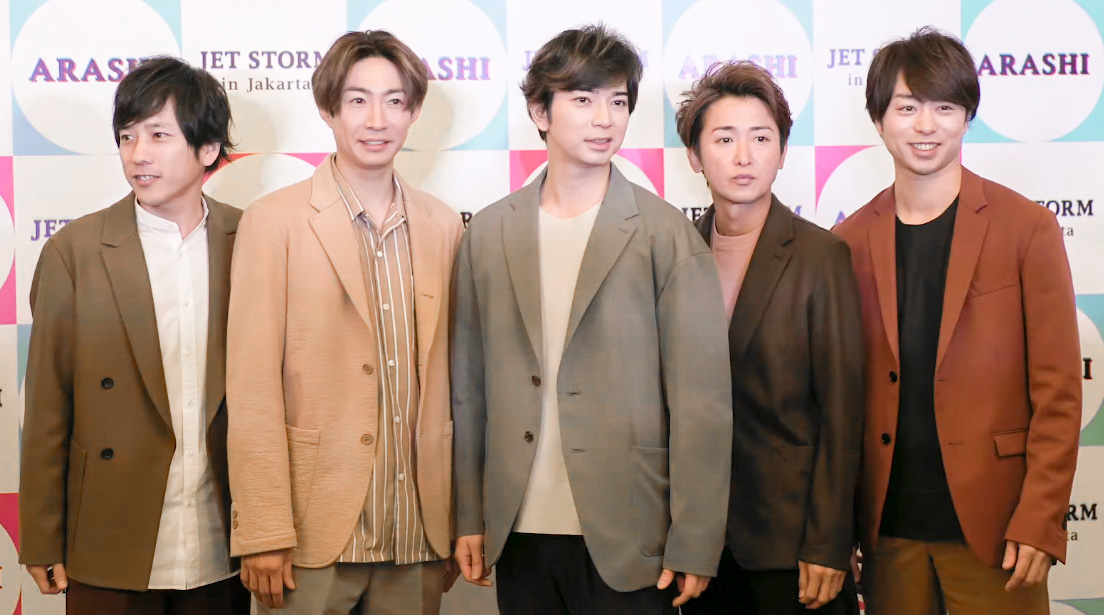
Arashi

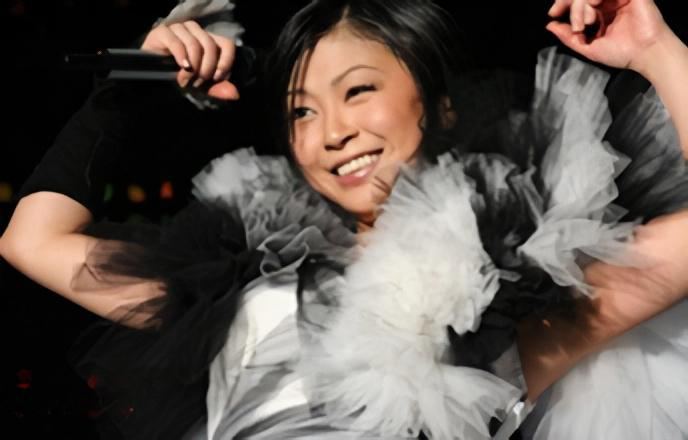
Hikaru Utada

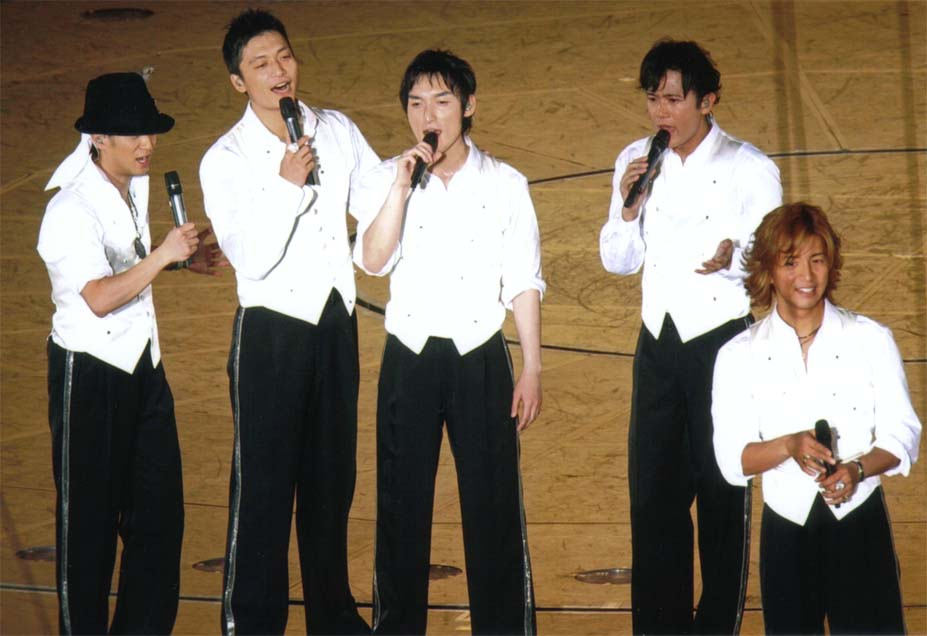
SMAP

Artist	Years active	Genre	Sales
Yumi Matsutoya	1968–present	Pop rock / Jazz fusion / Folk rock / Kayōkyoku	39.39 million
Arashi	1999–2026	Pop / rock / R&B	38.44 million
Zard	1991–2007	Pop rock / R&B / Soft rock / AOR	37.63 million
Hikaru Utada	1998–2010, 2016–present	J-pop / R&B / Dance / Electronica	37.34 million
SMAP	1991–2016	J-pop / R&B	37.20 million
Namie Amuro	1992–2018	Pop / R&B / Hip hop / EDM / Eurobeat	36.18 million
Chage and Aska	1979–1996, 1999–2009	Folk rock / Soft rock	31 million
X Japan	1982–1997, 2007–present	Heavy metal	30 million†
Seiko Matsuda	1980–present	Pop / Kayōkyoku	30 million†

=== 20 million to 29 million records ===
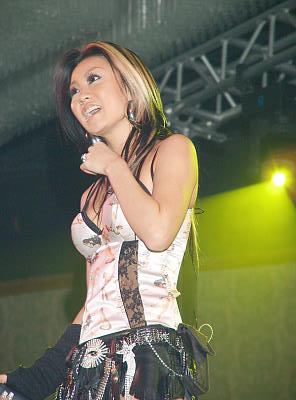
Koda Kumi

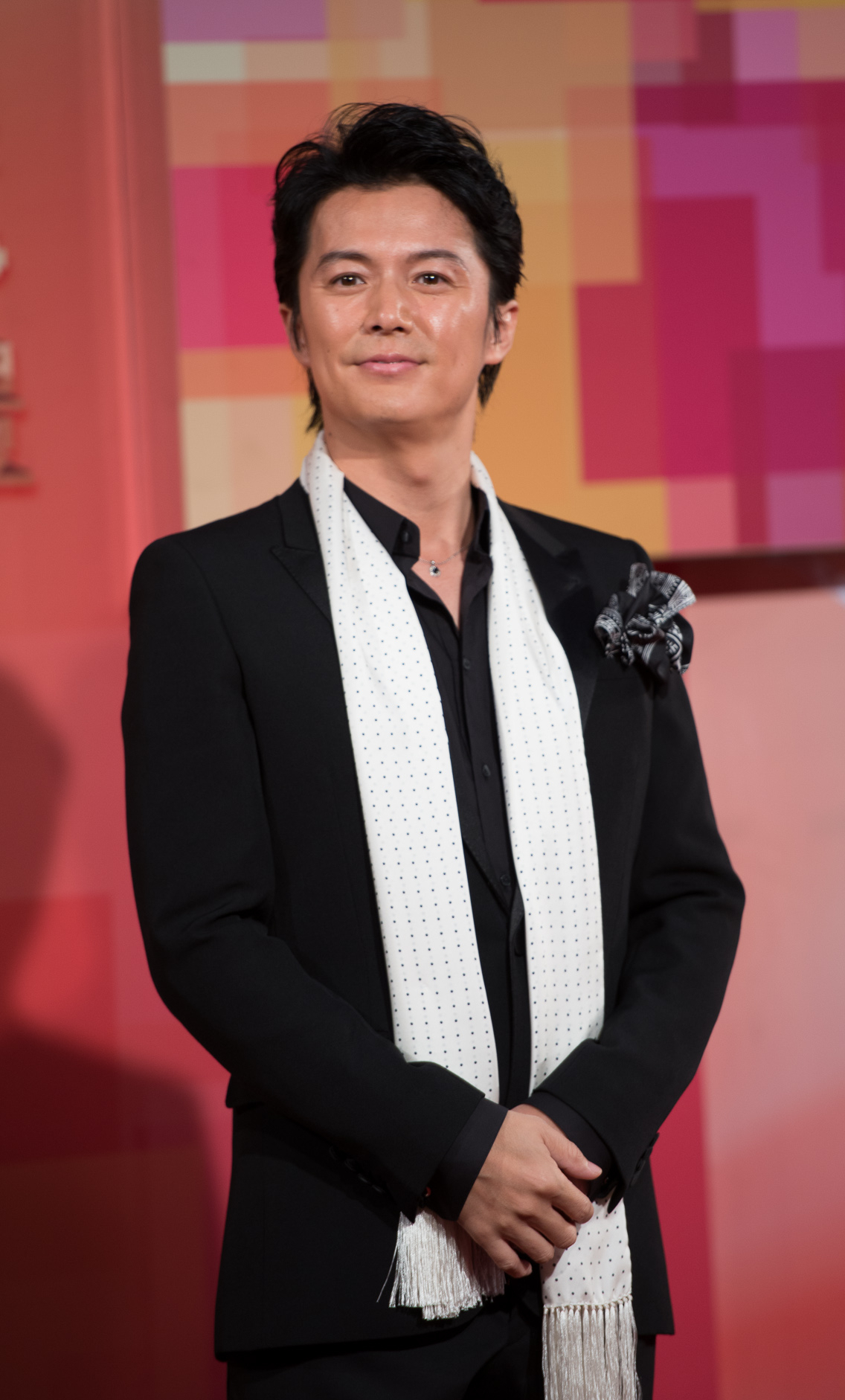
Masaharu Fukuyama

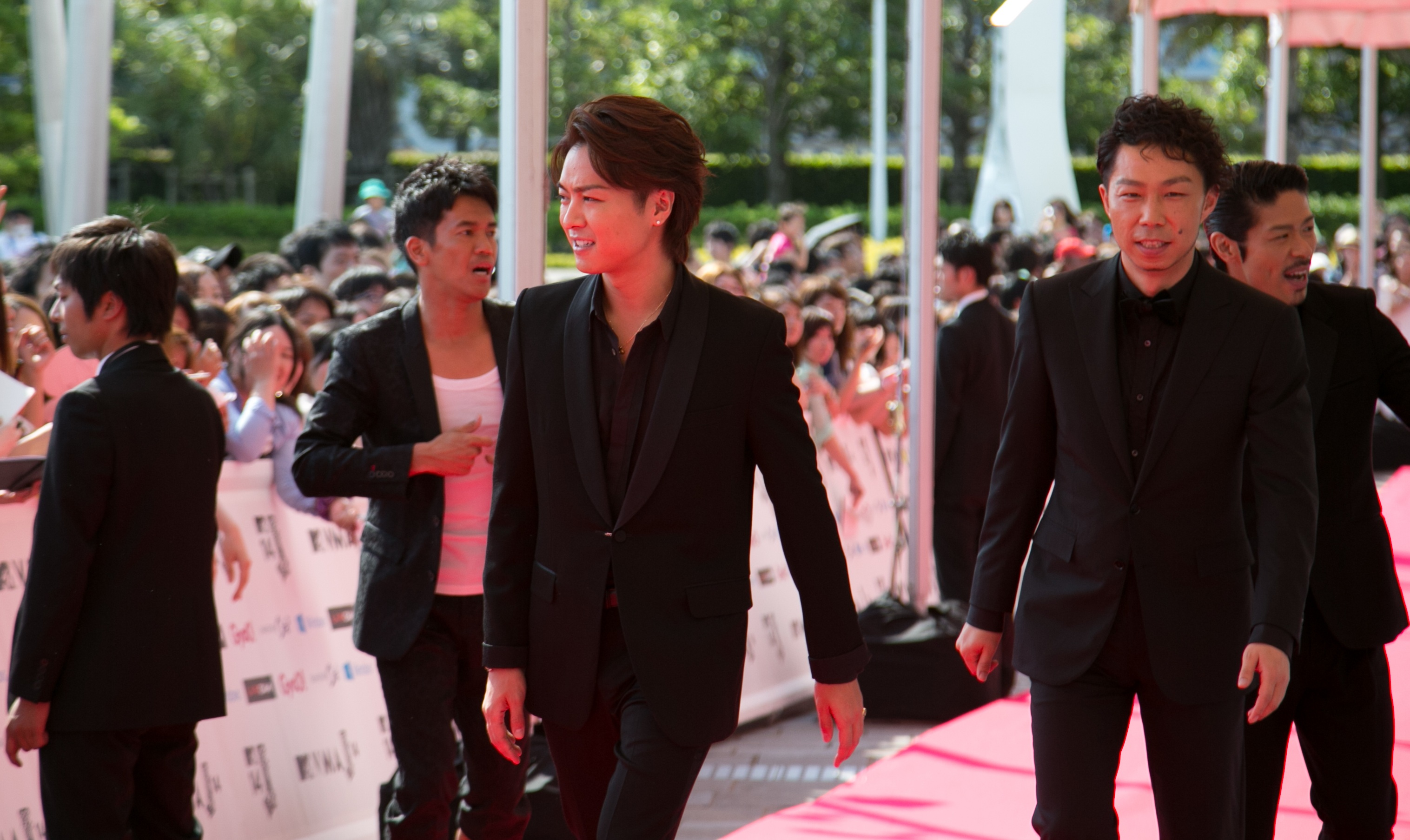
Exile

Artist	Years active	Genre	Sales
Globe	1995–2018	Synthpop / Eurobeat / Trance	28.94 million
KinKi Kids	1997–present	Pop	28.38 million
Koda Kumi	2000–present	J-pop / pop / R&B	27.5 million
Akina Nakamori	1982–present	Pop / Kayōkyoku	25.34 million
Tube	1985–present	Power pop / Surf rock / Blues rock	24.55 million
Masaharu Fukuyama	1990–present	Pop / Rock	24.10 million
Exile	2001–present	J-pop / R&B / Dance / House	23.44 million
Every Little Thing	1996–present	Pop rock / Soft rock / Synthpop	22.72 million
Maki Ohguro	1989–present	Pop / Dance-pop / New Wave	22.67 million
Morning Musume	1997–present	J-pop / Electropop / Dance-pop	22.47 million
Miyuki Nakajima	1975–present	Kayōkyoku / Folk / Rock / Enka	21.96 million
TRF	1993–present	J-pop / Hi-NRG / Rave / Techno	21.71 million
Tsuyoshi Nagabuchi	1977–present	Rock / Folk	21.64 million
Noriyuki Makihara	1990–present	Pop	21 million
Spitz	1987–present	Alternative rock / Pop rock	20.68 million
Speed	1996–2000, 2008–2012	Pop / Dance / R&B / Hip hop	20 million†
Misia	1998–present	R&B / Pop / Soul / Dance	20 million†

=== 10 million to 19 million records ===
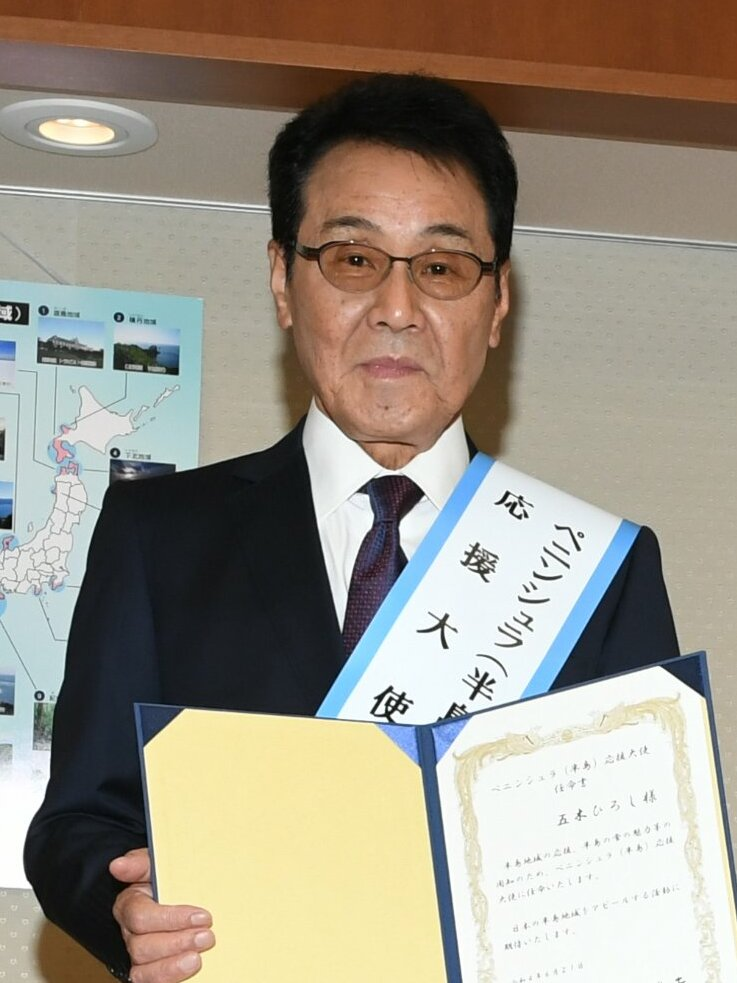
Hiroshi Itsuki

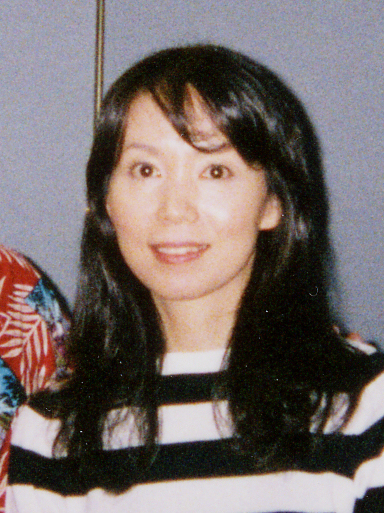
Mariya Takeuchi

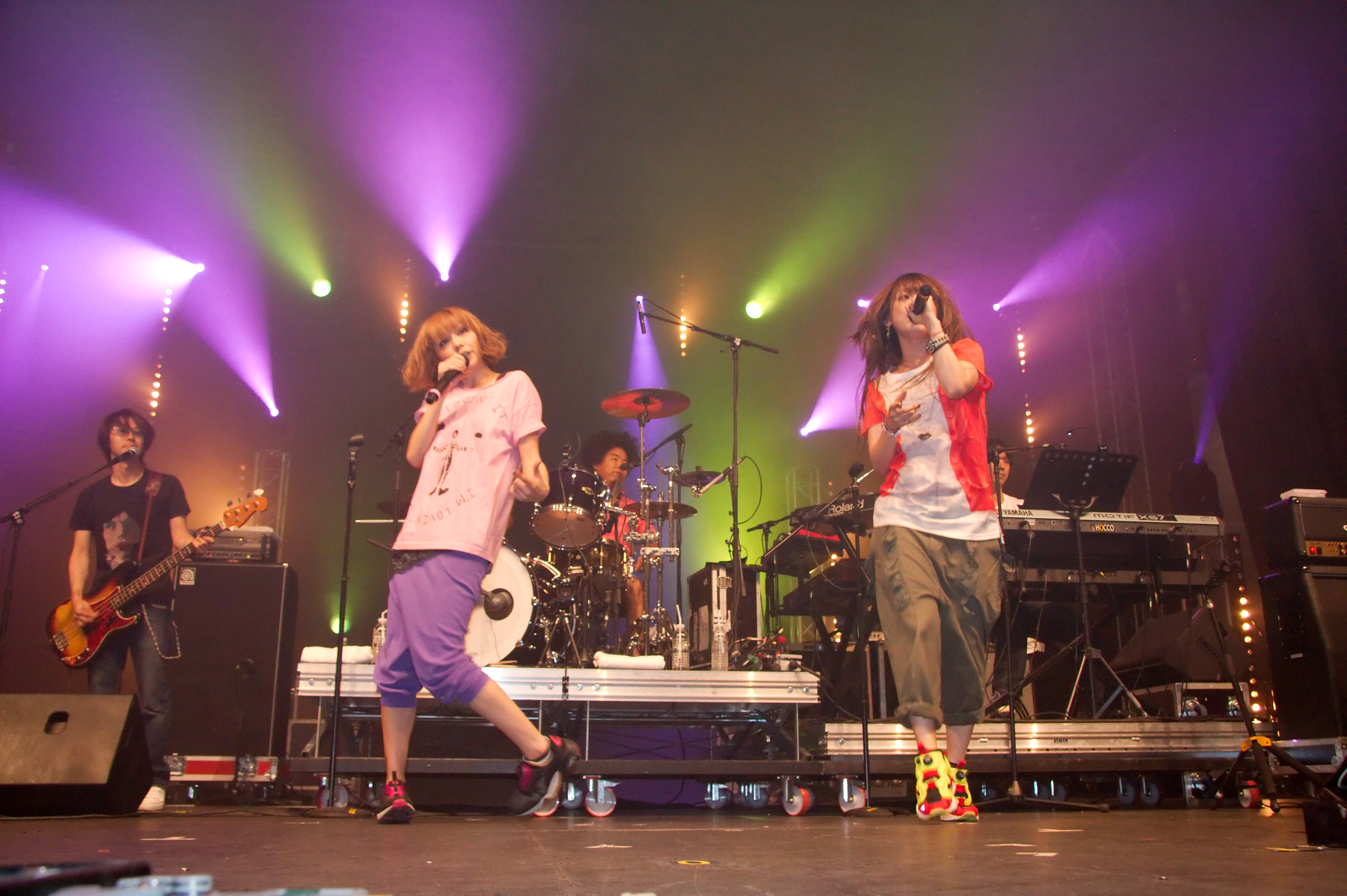
Puffy AmiYumi

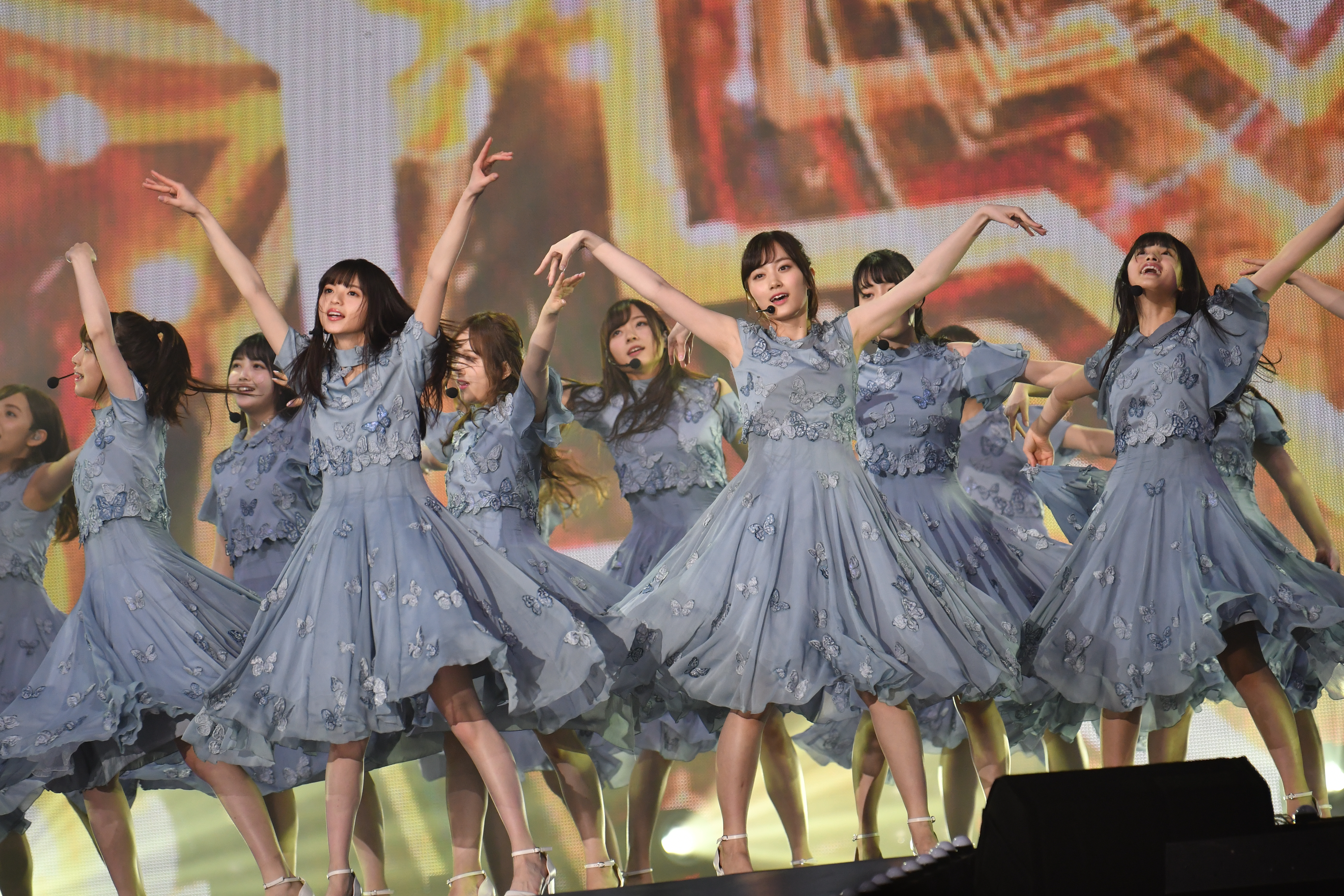
Nogizaka46

Artist	Years active	Genre	Sales
Hiroshi Itsuki	1965–present	Enka / Pop	19.24 million
Kome Kome Club	1982–1997, 2006–present	Pop rock / Psychedelic soul / Funk rock / Rakugo	18.66 million
Pink Lady	1976–1981, 1996–1997, 2003–2005, 2010–2017	Pop / Kayōkyoku / Disco	17 million
Kanjani8	2004–present	Pop / Rock / Enka / Kayōkyoku	17.00 million
Toshinobu Kubota	1981–present	R&B / Pop / Soul / Neo soul	16.33 million
Kyosuke Himuro	1978–2016	Rock / Pop	16.25 million
Momoe Yamaguchi	1973–1980	Pop / Kayōkyoku	16.22 million
Dragon Ash	1996–Present	Rap rock / Alternative rock	16 million
Mariya Takeuchi	1978–Present	Pop / Funk / Soul / Disco	16 million
Yōsui Inoue	1969–present	Rock / Folk	15.809 million
Hiromi Gō	1972–present	Pop / Kayōkyoku / R&B	15.78 million
Kenji Sawada	1969–present	Pop / Rock	15.71 million
Mai Kuraki	1999–present	Pop / R&B	15.5 million
The Checkers	1981–1992	Rock 'n' roll / Rockabilly / Pop rock / Doo-wop	15.38 million
Miki Imai	1986–present	Pop	15.31 million
Judy and Mary	1992–2001	Pop rock / Art punk / Alternative rock	15 million
Puffy AmiYumi	1995–present	Dance rock / Pop rock / Pop punk / Power pop	15 million
Shizuka Kudo	1987–Present	Pop / Kayōkyoku	15 million
Miho Nakayama	1985–2024	Pop / Kayōkyoku	14.97 million
Nogizaka46	2011–present	Pop	14.60 million
Mariah Carey	1988–present	Pop / Soul / R&B / Dance	14.5 million
Kyōko Koizumi	1982–present	Pop	14.26 million
Shinichi Mori	1966–present	Enka / Kayōkyoku	14.10 million
Hideki Saijo	1972–2018	Pop	13.30 million
Tomoyasu Hotei	1988–present	Rock	12.71 million
Misato Watanabe	1985–present	Pop / Funk / Rock	12.70 million
Toshihiko Tahara	1980–present	Pop	12.70 million
Masahiko Kondo	1980–present	Pop / Kayōkyoku	12.67 million
Hikaru Genji	1987–1996	Pop	12.22 million
Tomomi Kahara	1995–2006, 2013–present	Pop / Adult contemporary / Pop rock / Dance-pop	12.19 million
V6	1995–2021	Pop / Rock	12.12 million
Sandaime J Soul Brothers	2010–present	J-Pop / Dance / R&B	11.15 million†
Orange Range	2001–present	Rap rock / Alternative rock / Pop rock / Power pop	11 million
Princess Princess	1983–1996	J-pop / J-rock / Glam Rock	11 million
The Alfee	1974–present	Pop rock / Hard rock / Punk rock	10+ million
Luna Sea	1989–2000, 2010–present	Progressive rock / Alternative rock / Hard rock / Punk rock	10+ million†
Chemistry	2001–present	J-pop / R&B	10 million
MAX	1995–present	J-pop	10 million
Shiina Ringo	1998–present	J-pop / J-rock	10 million
KAT-TUN	2006–present	J-pop	10 million
aiko	1998–present	J-pop	10 million
Hiromi Iwasaki	1975–present	Pop / Kayōkyoku	10 million

=== 5 million to 9 million records ===
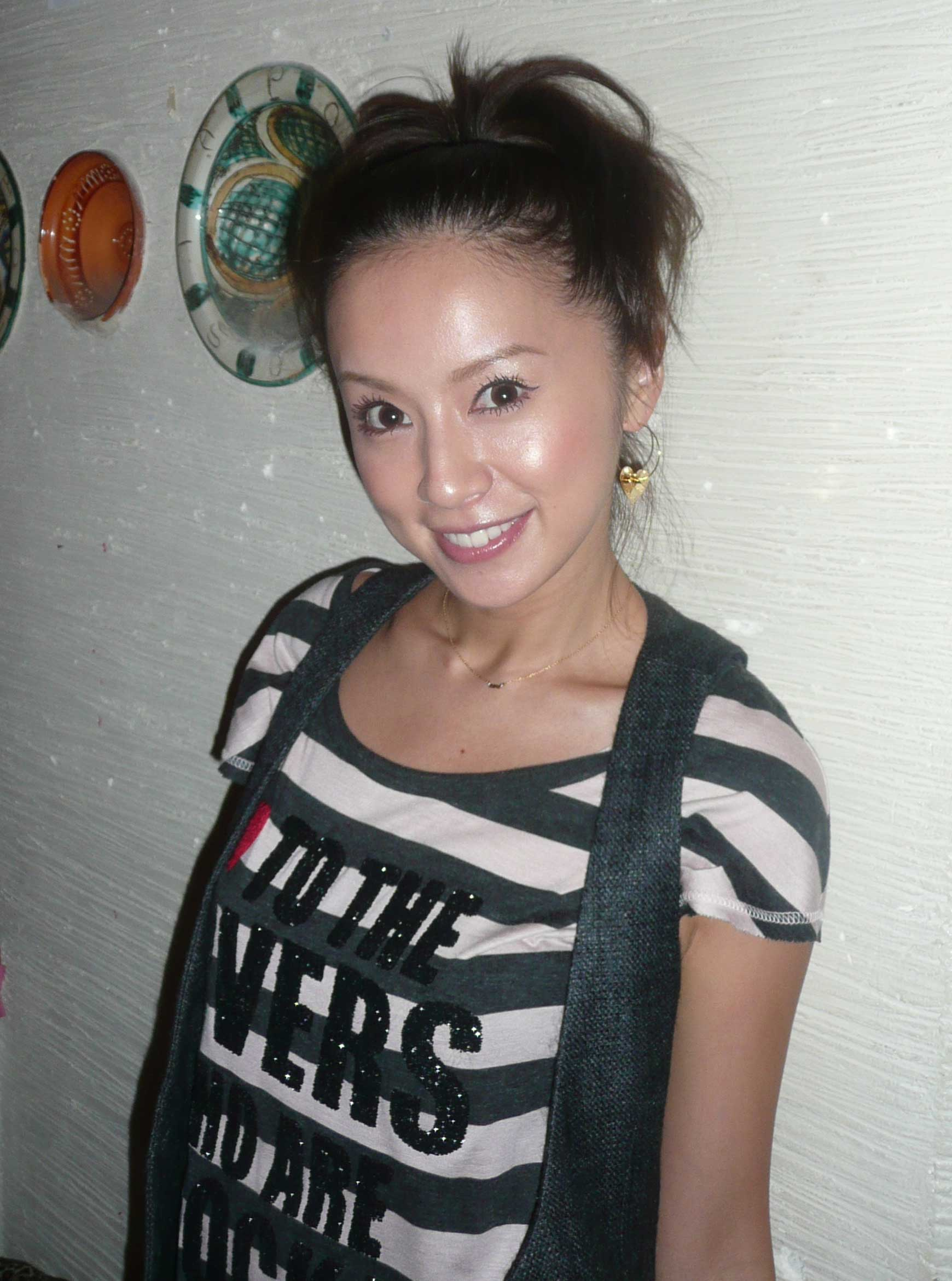
Ami Suzuki

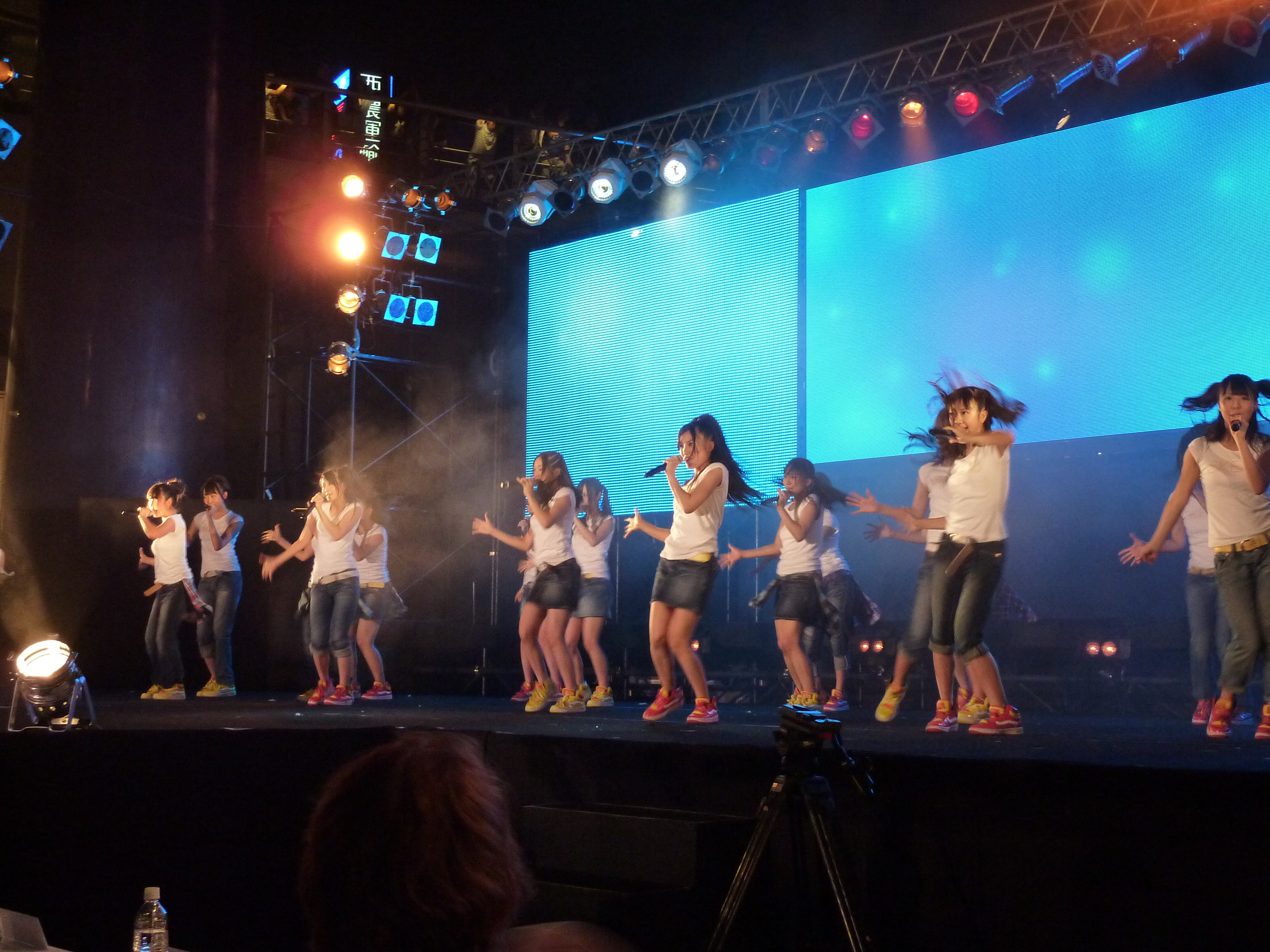
SKE48

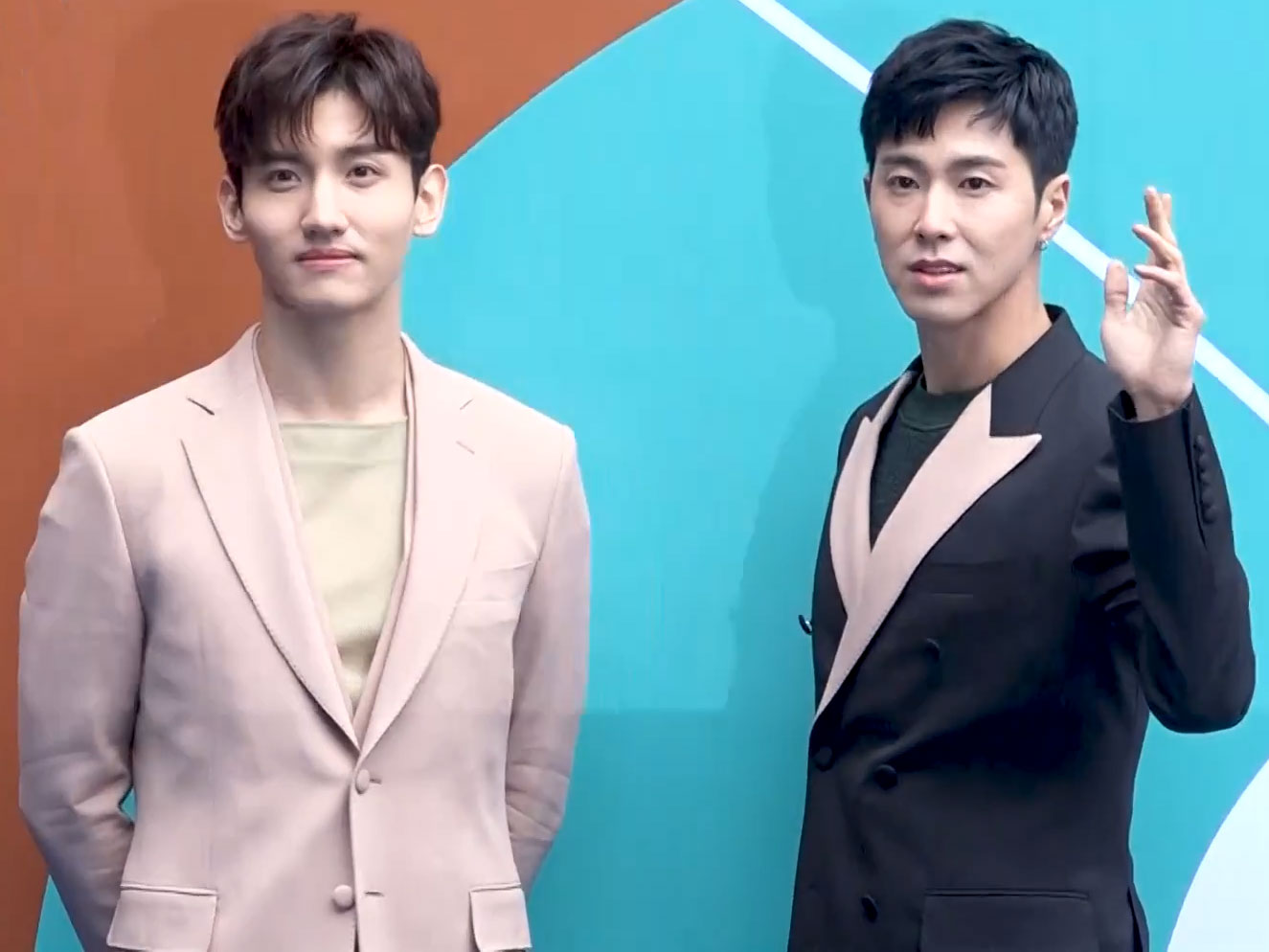
TVXQ

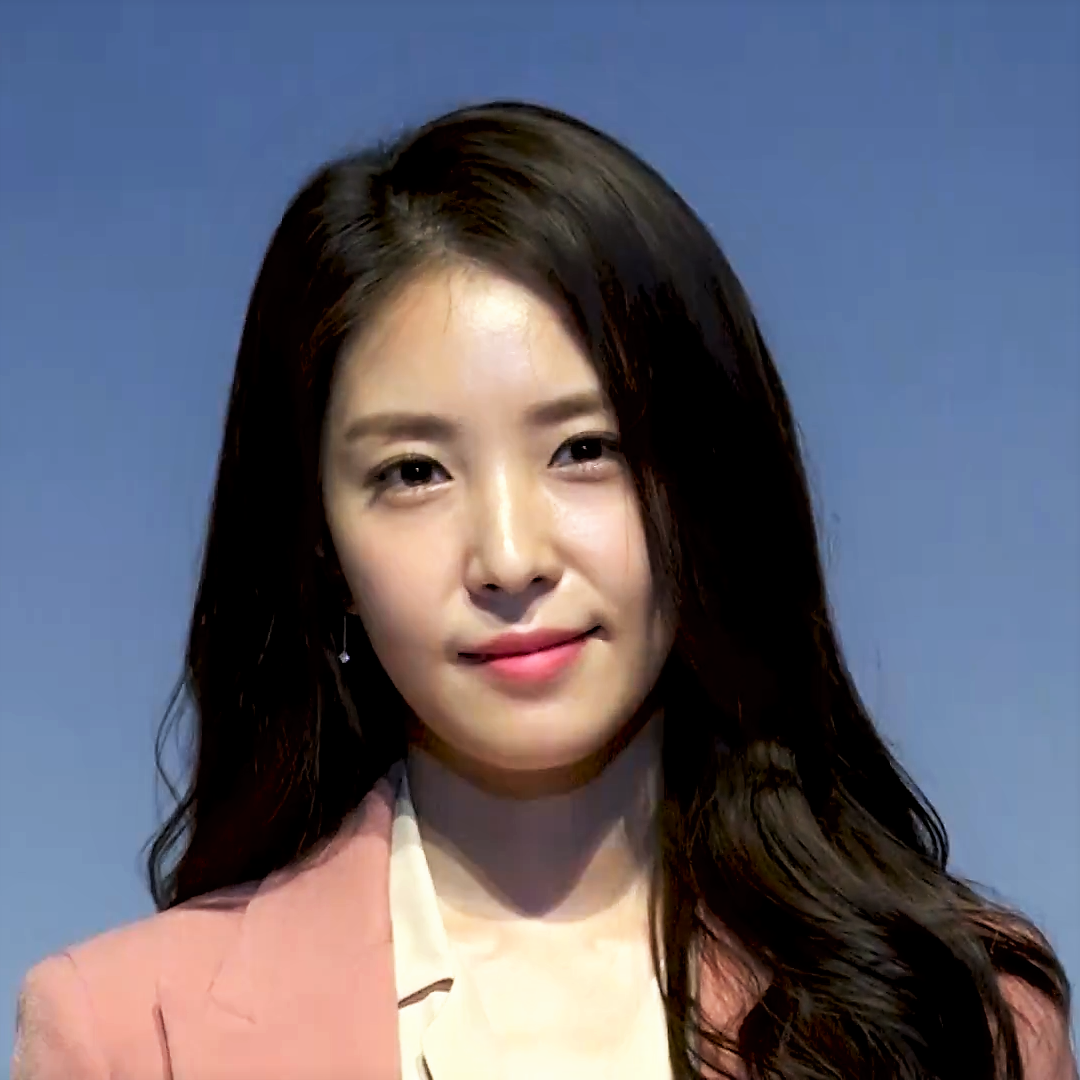
BoA

Artist	Years active	Genre	Sales
Goro Noguchi	1971–present	Kayōkyoku / Pop	9.50 million
Ami Suzuki	1998–2001, 2004–present	Pop / Dance-pop / EDM / Electro house	8.83 million
Hitomi	1992–present	Rock / Pop / Electronic	8.70 million
Tokio	1994–present	Power pop / Pop rock	8.19 million
SKE48	2008–present	Pop	8.15 million
KAT-TUN	1994–present	Pop / Rock	8.05 million
TVXQ	2003–present	Pop / Dance / R&B / Electronic / Rock	7.80 million†
BoA	2000–present	K-pop / J-pop / Dance-pop / R&B	7.75 million
Ketsumeishi	1993–present	Hip hop / Reggae / R&B	7.60 million
Wink	1988–1996	Pop	7.49 million
NMB48	2011–present	Pop	7.35 million
Celine Dion	1981–present	Pop / Rock	7.150 million
Da Pump	1996–present	J-pop / EDM / Eurodance / Hip hop	7 million
Ai Otsuka	2003–present	Pop	6.60 million
Naoko Kawai	1980–1996	Kayōkyoku	6.53 million
Madonna	1979–present	Pop / dance / electronica	6.45 million
Avril Lavigne	1999–present	Pop/Punk	6.4 million
Perfume	2000–present	Pop, Techno, Bitpop, Electropop, Dance-pop, Synthpop	6 million
Mari Amachi	1971–1977, 1979–present	Kayōkyoku	5.96 million
Hiroko Yakushimaru	1978–present	Kayōkyoku	5.85 million
Whitney Houston	1985–2012	Pop, RnB,Gospel,EDM	5.71 million
Gackt	1993–present	Rock	5.70 million
Yoko Minamino	1984–present	Pop	5.63 million
Shonentai	1985–present	Pop	5.48 million
Candies	1973–1978	Pop / Folk pop	5.45 million
Shibugakitai	1982–1988	Pop	5.43 million
Backstreet Boys	1993–present	Pop / Dance-pop	5.4 million
Lady Gaga	2008–present	Pop	5.4 million
Yōko Oginome	1983–present	Kayōkyoku	5.38 million
Yellow Magic Orchestra	1978–1984, 1992–1993, 2002–2004, 2007–2012	Electronic, Electro, Electropop, House, Synthpop, Techno	5.29 million
Crystal Kay	1999–present	Pop, R&B	5.2 million
Def Tech	2002–2007, 2010–present	Jawaiian Reggae	5 million
Rip Slyme	1994–present	Hip hop	5 million
Yui	2004–present	Pop / Rock	5 million

== Best-selling Western acts ==
The long-standing world's second biggest music market has seen record sales dominated by local music acts.

A selected group of Western acts have achieved certified units of over 4 million since Japan's music certification system inception by RIAJ in 1989. Prior RIAJ's certification system, various artists attained healthy sales. This include The Nolans whose sales were estimated at 12 million records, and French music conductor Paul Mauriat, with over 6 million records sold according to Billboard. Jeff Rovin wrote in Julio! (1985), that many of Julio Iglesias' albums sold over two million copies individually. In addition, Oricon's chart book (Oricon Album Chart Book: Complete Edition 1970–2005) provides record sales.

Highest certified Western artists by RIAJ (1989–present)
Artist	Certified sales (in millions)	Refs.
Mariah Carey	14.5 million	
Celine Dion*	7.150 million	
Madonna	6.450 million	
Avril Lavigne	6.4 million	
Whitney Houston	5.710 million	
Backstreet Boys	5.4 million	
Lady Gaga	5.4 million	
The Beatles	4.950 million	
Michael Jackson	4.650 million	
Enya	4.6 million	
Bon Jovi	4.4 million	

‡	Indicates a debutant artist prior RIAJ's certification program (e. 1989)

== Best-selling artist sales by year ==
Year	Artist	Album sales	Single sales	Total sales
1999	Hikaru Utada	7,365,830	5,383,770	12,749,600
2000	Ayumi Hamasaki	5,267,350	3,914,920	9,182,270
2001	Ayumi Hamasaki	5,311,950	5,067,910	10,379,860
2002	Hikaru Utada	3,526,780	2,410,990	5,667,770
2003	Ayumi Hamasaki	2,774,474	1,056,148	3,830,622
2004	Hikaru Utada	3,537,845	365,206	3,903,051
2005	Orange Range	3,479,539	2,242,257	5,721,796
2006	Koda Kumi	2,411,470	1,281,022	3,692,492
2007	Koda Kumi	1,318,072	534,035	1,852,107
2008	Exile	4,363,967	678,458	5,042,425
2009	Arashi	1,432,781	2,213,423	3,646,204
2010	Arashi	1,395,807	3,778,313	5,174,120
2011	AKB48	829,645	6,871,281	7,700,926
2012	AKB48	1,029,954	6,954,599	7,984,553
2013	AKB48	-	5,961,213	5,961,213
2014	AKB48	1,041,355	6,241,987	7,283,342
2015	AKB48	1,468,279	5,062,100	6,530,379
2016	AKB48	-	5,413,328	5,413,328
2017	AKB48	632,615	4,715,415	5,348,030
2018	AKB48	611,056	5,677,095	6,288,151
2019	Arashi	2,100,438	709,813	2,810,251
2020	Arashi	822,459	1,147,865	1,970,324
2021	BTS			
2022	BTS			
2023	King & Prince	1,399,236		
2024	Snow Man			

== See also ==
- List of best-selling singles in Japan
- List of best-selling albums in Japan
