= Kayōkyoku =

Japanese pop music genre

- Stylistic origins: Ryūkōka; traditional pop; traditional Japanese music; blues; Europop; Latin pop; jazz; rock and roll
- Cultural origins: 1920s, Japan
- Derivative forms: J-pop

Kayōkyoku (歌謡曲; lit. 'Pop Tune') is a Japanese pop music genre, which became a base of modern J-pop. The Japan Times described kayōkyoku as "standard Japanese pop" or "Shōwa-era pop".

Kayōkyoku represents a blend of Western and Japanese musical scales. Music in this genre is extremely varied as a result. Kayōkyoku in the narrower and more practical sense, however, excludes J-pop and enka.

Unlike "J-pop" singers such as Southern All Stars' Keisuke Kuwata, the singers of the kayōkyoku genre do not use stylized pronunciations based on the English language, but prefer traditional Japanese. There are exceptions, such as in singer Momoe Yamaguchi's song "Rock 'n' Roll Widow".

Unlike enka, kayōkyoku is also not based on emotional displays of effort while singing.

Famous kayōkyoku artists include Hiroko Yakushimaru, Kyu Sakamoto, the Peanuts, the Tigers, Candies, Pink Lady, Seiko Matsuda, Junko Sakurada, the Checkers and Onyanko Club.

== Characteristics ==
Kayōkyoku music has simple melodies that are easy to follow and play along to. The lyrics of kayōkyoku are simple and attempt to relate to an everyday Japanese individual. Kayōkyoku singers also relate to common Japanese listeners by appearing as cute and approachable, with many aspects about their appearance and actions dictated by production companies. The base of kayōkyoku songs aims towards a sentimental feeling. The music draws on being able to relate to listeners and tries to voice the feelings that they keep bottled in due to social appearances. Kayōkyoku's style has become prominent due to the karaoke boom that occurred in the middle of the 1970s. A large focus of karaoke revolves around mimicking not only the song being sung, but also the image of the singer and the image brought out by the lyrics. The simple rhythm and lyrics of kayōkyoku made these songs very popular to sing at karaoke. An NHK survey conducted in 1982 revealed that around 80% of males over thirty years of age sang kayōkyoku songs through karaoke machines.

== History ==
=== 1920s–1940s: Origin ===
The term kayōkyoku originally referred to Western classical "lied" in Japan. However, NHK radio began to use the term as another name of ryūkōka around 1927, and this took hold in the late second decade of the Showa Era (1935–1944). However, many songs popular during this era became lost due to the association with painful memories involving World War II.

=== 1950s–1960s: Mood kayō era ===
Kayokyoku, though associated with ryūkōka, also refers to a specific musical genre unique from ryūkōka. For example, Kenji Yamamoto (山本健治) said that the popular genre of Showa 20s (1945 – 1954) was ryūkōka and the popular genre of Showa 30s (1955–1964) was kayōkyoku.

In Showa 30s, Frank Nagai, inspired by jazz, sang new songs called "Mood Kayō" (ムード歌謡). During the Japanese post-war economic miracle, Mood Kayō music became one of the most popular genres in Japan. "Mood Kayō" was influenced by Latin and jazz music. On the other hand, in Showa 30s, modern enka began to be formed and rock and roll began to have an influence on Japanese popular singers such as Kyu Sakamoto.

In 1949, 12-year-old Hibari Misora made her recording debut with song "Kappa Boogie Woogie". In the 1950s, Misora, Chiemi Eri and Izumi Yukimura were called "Sannin Musume" (lit. "Three Girls"). Hachiro Kasuga, Michiya Mihashi and Hideo Murata were called "three crows". In the early 1960s, Kyu Sakamoto and the Peanuts became famous. Shinichi Mori debuted in 1966. Linda Yamamoto also debuted in 1966. In the late 1960, Group Sounds became famous. Teruhiko Saigo, Yukio Hashi and Kazuo Funaki were called "Gosanke" in the 1960s. Keiko Fuji debuted in 1969 and the music genre like her songs was called enka, which was like Japanese traditional music. In 1969, Japanese child singer Osamu Minagawa made the Japanese Oricon weekly number-one single "Kuroneko no Tango" at the age of only six, establishing the still-standing youngest record to top the Oricon single charts.

During the 1950s and 60s, many Kayōkyoku groups and singers gained experience performing on US military bases in Japan. Around the same time, yakuza manager Kazuo Taoka reorganized the concert touring industry by treating the performers as professionals.

In terms of imported foreign talent, Kayōkyoku from this period is also believed to have been influenced by Chinese immigrant jazz musicians who had fled Shanghai during the communist takeover, as well as, with the American soldiers who were occupying Japan at that time. In 1949, when the communists took over Mainland China and established the People's Republic of China, one of the first actions taken by the government was to denounce popular music as decadent and replace it with Chinese revolutionary music. Although a number of Shanghainese musicians fled to the British colony of Hong Kong, a few musicians instead settled in Japan, where they became members of the Far East Network and collaborated with the American soldiers to introduce a variety of new genres to the Japanese public.

Some of the most famous kayōkyoku musicians of this era include songwriter Rokusuke Ei and singer Kyu Sakamoto. Their 1961 song "Sukiyaki" in particular became a global hit and topped the Billboard Hot 100 chart.

=== 1970s–1980s: Idol kayō era ===
In the 1970s, Hiromi Go (who belonged to Johnny & Associates at that time), Hideki Saijo and Goro Noguchi were called "New Gosanke". Saori Minami, Mari Amachi and Rumiko Koyanagi were called "Shin Sannin Musume" (lit. "New Three Girls"). Akiko Wada, who came from "Jazz Cafe", also became popular. Momoe Yamaguchi, Junko Sakurada and Masako Mori were called "Hana no Chūsan Torio" (lit. "Flower Junior High School Three Grade Trio"). Yū Aku became one of the most famous lyricists of kayōkyoku. He wrote Finger 5's 1973 song "Kojin Jugyō" and female duo Pink Lady's 1976 debut song "Pepper Keibu".

In the 1980s, many female idols such as Seiko Matsuda, Yukiko Okada and Akina Nakamori became popular. Johnny's male solo singer Masahiko Kondō also became popular and his song "Orokamono" won the 29th Japan Record Awards Grand Prix Award in 1987. The music genre kayōkyoku is regarded as a base of another genre "J-pop". In the 1980s, a part of Japanese idol was independent from kayōkyoku and associated with Japanese rock musicians. Late 80s' popular band Onyanko Club was a band of borderline era between "kayōkyoku" and "J-pop". Although Japanese kayōkyoku-style music after Hikaru Genji and Dreams Come True was called "J-pop", several people claimed that "J-pop" was a subgenre of kayōkyoku music.

In the 1980s, remained kayōkyoku music except Japanese idol's music became regarded as enka. After Hibari Misora died in 1989, the genre called kayōkyoku mostly vanished and several kayōkyoku singers became regarded as enka singers, even if their sound did not change. However, Shinichi Mori and Kiyoshi Maekawa considered themselves to be not enka singers but kayōkyoku singers. Maekawa claimed that an example of true enka singers was Saburō Kitajima, who could use a lot of kobushi (a kind of vocalism) for singing. As the result, the music of the genre caused some confusion. For example, Kiyoshi Maekawa's song "Himawari", produced by pop singer Masaharu Fukuyama, was regarded as enka for no special reason. When Junko Akimoto became popular in 2008, however, she was said to be a modern example of kayōkyoku singers.

=== Later popularity ===
As of the 2020s, it has been said there is a "Shōwa Kayo Boom" (Japanese: 昭和歌謡ブーム) and that Shōwa era kayōkyoku songs have become popular among young people.
