= Ichirō Satsuki =

Ichirō Satsuki (五月一朗, Satsuki Ichirō) (7 July 1919 – 4 September 2014) was a Japanese rōkyoku singer. He died at the age of 95.
