= Enka =

Japanese music genre

- Stylistic origins: Ryūkōka; rōkyoku; min'yō; tango; blues; doo wop
- Cultural origins: 1950s, Japan

Enka (演歌) is a Japanese music genre. It is considered to resemble traditional Japanese music stylistically. Modern enka, however, is a relatively recent musical form which adopts a more traditional musical style in its vocalism than ryūkōka music, popular during the prewar years.

Modern enka, as developed in the postwar era, is a form of sentimental ballad music. Some of the first modern enka singers were Hachiro Kasuga, Michiya Mihashi, and Hideo Murata. The revival of enka in its modern form happened in 1969, when Keiko Fuji made her debut. The most famous male enka singers are Shinichi Mori and Kiyoshi Hikawa.

== Etymology ==
The term enka was first used to refer to political texts set to music which were sung and distributed by opposition activists belonging to the Freedom and People's Rights Movement during the Meiji period (1868–1912) as a means of bypassing government curbs on speeches of political dissent – and in this sense the word is derived from "enzetsu no uta" (演説の歌), meaning "speech song".

Another theory holds that modern enka means "enjiru uta" (演じる歌), meaning "performance song".

The genre called enka is also said to be an expedient classification for record labels as well as J-pop. For example, Harumi Miyako, who has been usually considered an enka singer, said "I don't think that I sing 'enka'" and "In fact, there was no such term as 'enka' when I debuted." (Note: Original text: "わたし、自分が演歌をうたってるとは思ってませんから。" "じっさい、あたしがデビューしたころは、特に演歌なんて言い方はしなかったですよ。")

== Musical style ==
Modern enka's mainstream scale is called Yonanuki Tan-Onkai (ヨナ抜き短音階) or "Minor Scale without Four and Seven (fa and te)", and is a modified version of Yonanuki Chō-Onkai (ヨナ抜き長音階) or "Major Scale without Four and Seven (Fa and Si)", which came from an older Japanese scale, the "Ryo Scale" (呂音階, Ryo Onkai). One of the earliest Japanese songs that was said to have partly used it is Rentarō Taki's "Kōjō no Tsuki", which was called shōka (唱歌; "school song") in the Meiji period. The seventh- scale degree is not used in "Kōjō no Tsuki", a song of B minor.

The music, based on the pentatonic scale, has some resemblance to blues. Enka lyrics are usually written similarly around the themes of love and loss, loneliness, enduring hardships, and persevering in the face of difficulties, even suicide or death. Although enka is a genre of kayōkyoku, it is considered to be more expressive and emotional, though there is no clear consensus on the matter.

Archetypal enka singers employ a style of melisma—where a single syllable of text is sung while moving between several different notes in succession—known as kobushi. Kobushi occurs when the pitch of the singer's voice fluctuates irregularly within one scale degree: This compares with vibrato, which vibrates in a regular cycle. The kobushi technique is not limited to enka, as can be heard in the Italian song "Santa Lucia." In the late 1930s and early '40s, the music of composer Masao Koga began to resemble Buddhist shomyo-chanting possibly because his record label asked him to produce music. Although Koga became a composer whose work is considered seminal to the creation of the genre, present-day enka is different from Koga's primary music because the singing styles of many postwar singers were different from the kobushi of Koga's musical note. Modern enka singer Takeshi Kitayama himself admitted in 2006, "I was even confused because [Koga's] musical note was different from that of an old singer." (Note: Original text: "昔の人が歌った音資料と楽譜が違って戸惑いもしました")

Enka suggests a traditional, idealized, or romanticized aspect of Japanese culture and attitudes. Enka singers, predominantly women, usually perform in a kimono or in evening dress. Male enka performers tend to wear formal dress, or in some performances, traditional Japanese attire. Nods to traditional Japanese music are common in enka. The melodies of enka are fundamentally Western harmonies, and electronic instruments are used, such as synthesizers and electric lead guitar with plenty of distortion, but its musical instruments also include traditional Japanese instruments such as the shakuhachi and the shamisen.

== History ==
=== 19th century–1920s: Sōshi enka and violin enka ===
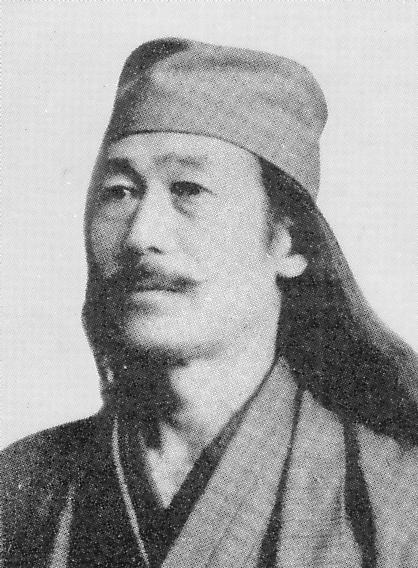
Soeda Azenbō, enka-shi in the Meiji Period

The political songs called enka in the Meiji period (1868–1912) are also called Sōshi Enka (壮士演歌) to distinguish it from modern enka. Street singers were called enka-shi (演歌師). The first enka song is said to be "The Dynamite Stanzas" (ダイナマイト節). The songs during this time include Otojiro Kawakami's "Oppekepe".

In the Taishō period (1912–26), enka-shi began to incorporate the violin, thus their songs were called violin enka. An enka-shi of the period was Toshio Sakurai (桜井敏雄), who in turn taught Haruo Oka.

In present-day Japan, Road Traffic Law regulates the appearance of street performers. However, Japanese performers such as Utaji Fukuoka (福岡詩二) have still sung enka from the Taishō period. When the 1995 earthquake struck, Soul Flower Mononoke Summit, a musical project of the rock band Soul Flower Union, played sōshi enka to help buoy the spirits of disaster victims.

=== 1920s–1940s: Era of ryūkōka ===
In the early Shōwa period in the late 1920s, record companies produced ryūkōka in place of enka-shi. Enka-shi began to use guitar and were dubbed nagashi (流し). Haruo Oka debuted with the 1939 song "Kokkyō no Haru" (国境の春, lit. "Spring at the Border") on the Japanese record label King Records. However, the term enka became uncommon in the postwar years.

=== Late 1940s–1954: The arrival of new singers ===
As jazz became popular in early postwar Japan, Japanese singer Hibari Misora released her debut song "Kappa boogie-woogie" on Nippon Columbia in 1949 at the age of only 12. She went on to sing jazz songs throughout the 1950s and 1960s. She later did many enka songs in the 60s and 70s.

In 1948, Hachiro Kasuga won King Records' first talent contest. He joined the record label the next year where Haruo Oka was his senior. His debut single "Akai Lamp no Shū Ressha" (赤いランプの終列車, lit. "Last Train with Red Lamp") was released in 1952. The kabuki-style song "Otomi-san" (お富さん, lit. "Miss Otomi") was originally made for Oka, but was sung by Kasuga, and in 1954, "Otomi-san" became a very popular hit in Japan. Kasuga took part in the NHK Kōhaku Uta Gassen for the first time with "Otomi-san" that year. The song's composer, Masanobu Tokuchi, was born on Okinawa Island and grew up in Amami and became an important figure for introducing the Ryukyu Islands' music into the Japanese mainstream.

=== 1955–1959: Early history of modern enka ===
Although "Otomi-san" was popular, Kasuga himself was not completely satisfied with it and recorded the song "Wakare no Ippon-sugi" (別れの一本杉, lit. "Farewell One Cedar") by Toru Funamura. The song was released in 1955 and was later regarded as a true enka song. The song, ironically, was also influenced by tango music's rhythm because Funamura felt that tango seemed similar to enka in its local color. "Wakare no Ippon-sugi" was later covered by singers as diverse as Michiya Mihashi, Hideo Murata, Keiko Fuji, Hibari Misora, Saburō Kitajima, Takashi Hosokawa, and Hiroshi Itsuki. Kasuga was later called the first enka singer.

Michiya Mihashi, who originally sang Japanese folk music (min'yō) and learned tsugaru-jamisen, released his debut single "Sake no Nigasa yo" as a recording singer in 1954. Mihashi's "Onna Sendō Uta" was a hit in 1955. Funamura's friend Kimio Takano, the lyricist of "Wakare no Ippon-sugi", died in 1956 at the age of 26. Hibari Misora's music turned to enka when she was no longer regarded as a teen idol.

Around the postwar period, rōkyoku (or naniwa-bushi), famous during the war, declined in popularity mainly because their speaking lengths were considered too long. Enka, on the other hand, which became popular around that time, was said to be a shortened version of rōkyoku because several enka singers such as Hideo Murata and Haruo Minami were originally rōkyoku singers and enka has many themes in common with the genre. One notable rōkyoku singer who had an influence on enka was Kumoemon Tochuken, whose student's pupil was Murata. Minami debuted on Teichiku Records in 1957 and Murata on Nippon Columbia in 1958. Murata covered the song "Jinsei Gekijō" (人生劇場, lit. "Drama of Life"), composed by Masao Koga. Haruo Minami was known for wearing a kimono, which was at the time considered an unusual style for a male singer.

=== 1960s–1970s: Commercial success ===
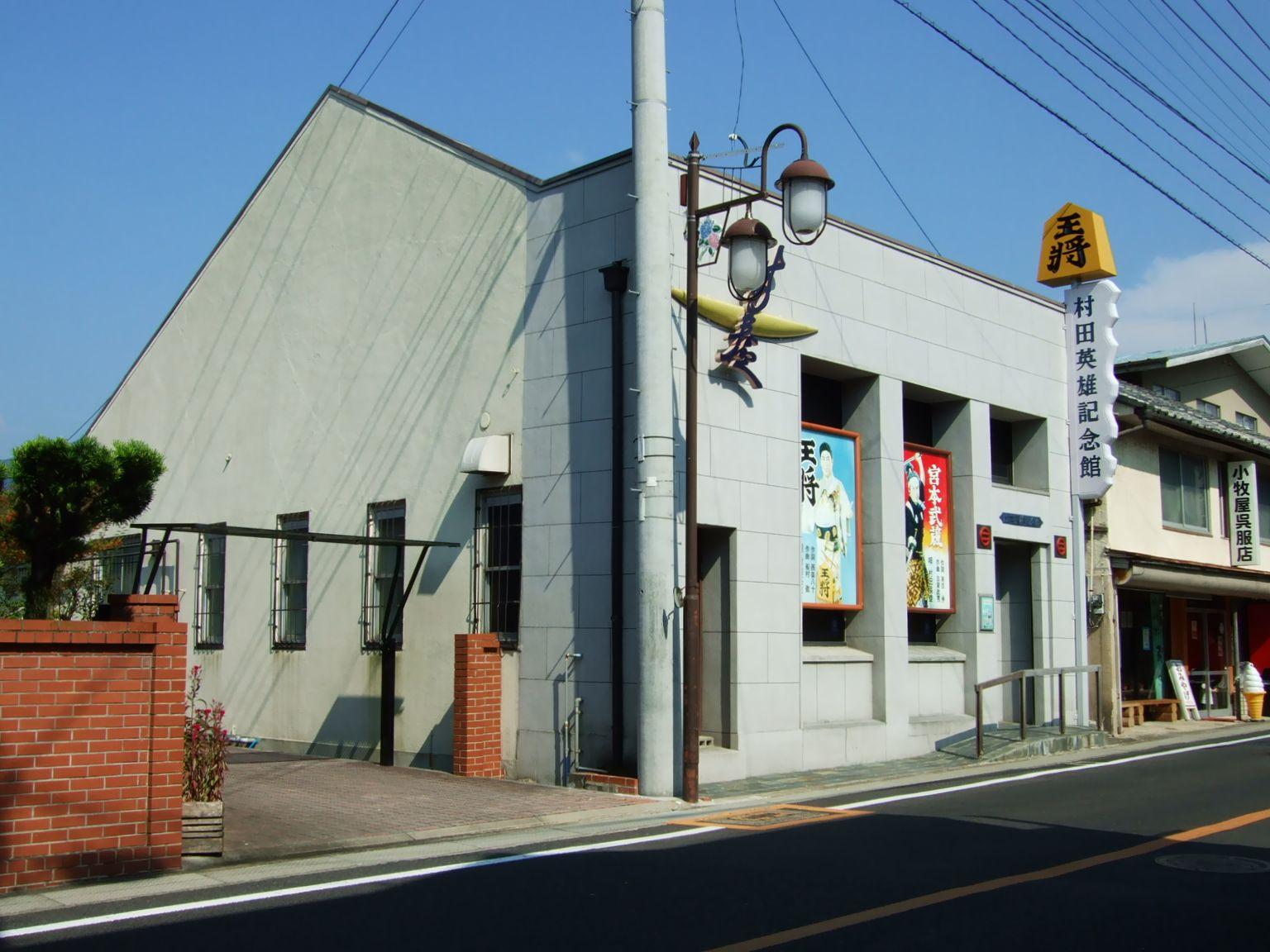
The memorial museum of singer Hideo Murata

In the early 1960s, rockabilly influenced by Elvis Presley began to gain popularity. Kyu Sakamoto, who came from Japanese rockabilly, joined Japanese popular music. However, many Japanese music critics complained about rockabilly, and Hideo Murata's 1961 "pure Japanese style"-like song "Ōsho", composed by Toru Funamura, became a million-selling single in Japan. When Kyu Sakamoto took part in the Kōhaku Uta Gassen for the first time with the song "Ue o Muite Arukō" (aka "Sukiyaki") in 1961, Hideo Murata also made his debut with the song "Ōsho" at the same show.

Young enka singer Yukio Hashi appeared in 1960, Saburō Kitajima in 1962 and Harumi Miyako in 1964. Sachiko Kobayashi debuted with the 1964 single "Usotsuki Kamome" (ウソツキ鴎, lit. "Liar Seagull") at the age of only 10. The most well-known and beloved performer of enka is Hibari Misora (1937–1989), known as the "Queen of Enka" and "Queen of Shōwa" for the period in which she lived and was celebrated. Misora's song "Yawara", composed by Masao Koga, won the grand prix award at the 1965 Japan Record Award. Masaru Matsuyama also made his debut in 1965, but was not able to achieve commercial success and changed his stage name to Hiroshi Itsuki in 1971.

Mina Aoe appeared with the single "Kōkotsu no Blues" (恍惚のブルース, lit. "Ecstasy Blues") in 1966, pioneering the "enka-blues" genre. Shinichi Mori debuted with the 1966 single "Onna no Tameiki" (女のためいき, lit. "Woman's Sigh"). His 1969 song "Minatomachi Blues" (港町ブルース, lit. "Port Town Blues") topped the Japanese Oricon single charts for five weeks and sold over one million copies. Keiko Fuji came out with the 1969 single "Shinjuku no Onna" (新宿の女, lit. "Woman in Shinjuku") at the age of 18. The term enka which had not been used in the postwar era, was revived by her performance.

Keiko Fuji's 1970 song "Keiko no Yume wa Yoru Hiraku" won the mass popularity award of the 12th Japan Record Awards and the grand prix award of the first Japan Music Awards. That year, she also took part in the 21st Kōhaku Uta Gassen with the song. Her 1970 album Shinjuku no Onna/'Enka no Hoshi' Fuji Keiko no Subete (新宿の女/"演歌の星" 藤圭子のすべて, Woman in Shinjuku/'Star of Enka' All of Keiko Fuji) established a record-breaking consecutive number-one record to top the Oricon charts for 20 "consecutive" weeks. It is a record that still stands.

The best-selling enka after the Oricon charts began in 1968 is Shiro Miya and Pinkara Trio's 1972 "Onna no Michi." The song topped the Japanese Oricon single charts for 16 consecutive weeks and sold over 3.25 million copies, to become the second best-selling single in Japan behind "Oyoge! Taiyaki-kun."

Hiroshi Itsuki's song "Yozora" won the grand prix award at the 15th Japan Record Awards in 1973. Shinichi Mori released the single "Erimo Misaki" in 1974. Although the song was composed by non-enka musician Takuro Yoshida, "Erimo Misaki" won the grand prix at the 16th Japan Record Awards that year. Harumi Miyako's song "Kita no Yado kara" also won the grand prix at the 18th Japan Record Awards in 1976. New enka singers, who debuted in the '70s, include Sayuri Ishikawa and Takashi Hosokawa who were both Michiya Mihashi's pupils.

Masao Koga died in 1978, after a career of composing about 5,000 songs. Toru Funamura became self-employed in 1978, beginning live performances and returning to the original position for his old friend Kimio Takano. Keiko Fuji announced her retirement in 1979 and went to the United States.

=== 1980s–1990s: Losing definition and decline ===
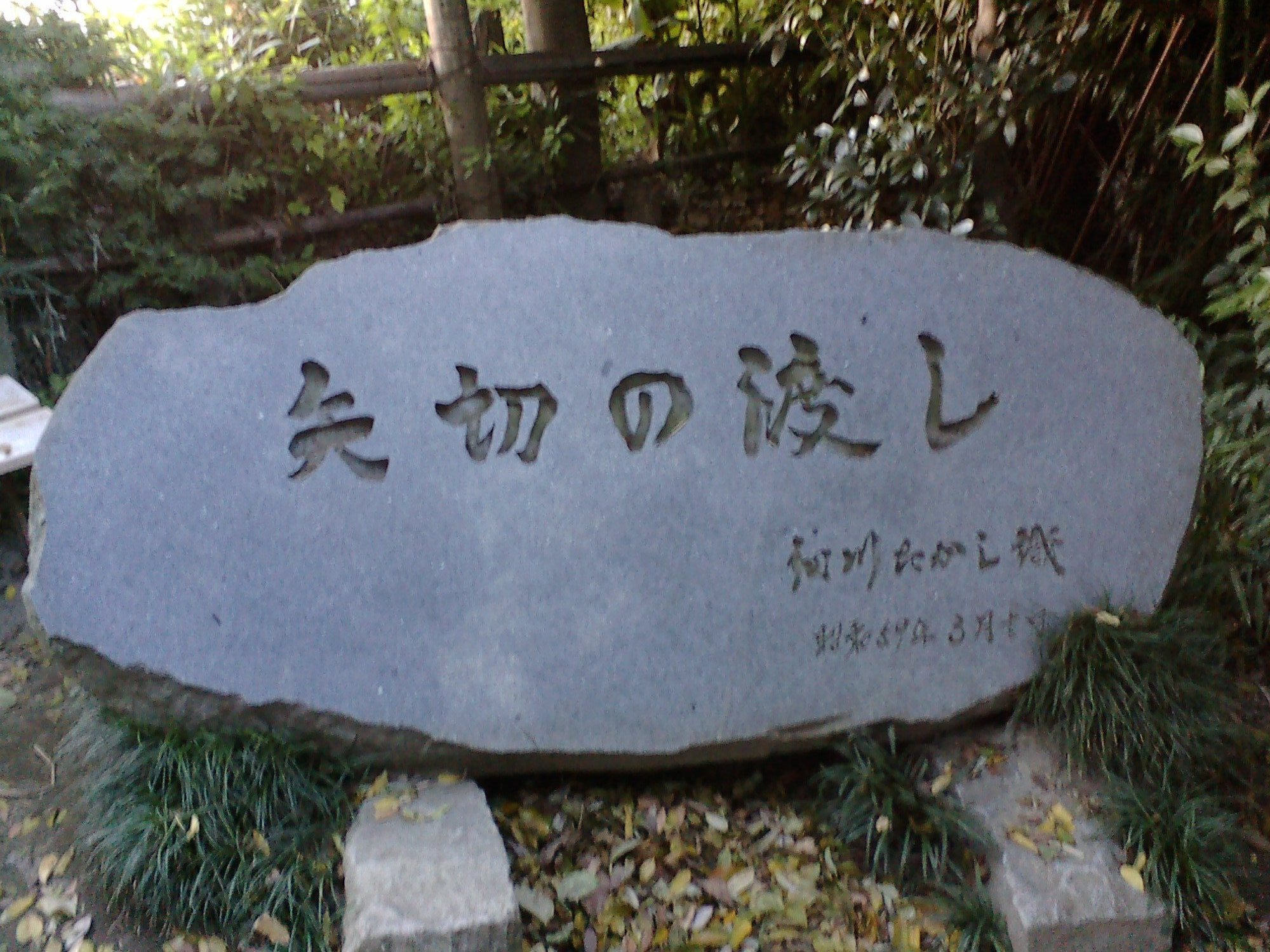
The 1984 monument of Naomi Chiaki's song covered by Takashi Hosokawa "Yagiri no Watashi" at Matsudo City

Takashi Hosokawa's song "Kita Sakaba" won the grand prix at the 24th Japan Record Awards in 1982. He covered Naomi Chiaki's original song "Yagiri no Watashi" next year. It was also won the grand prix at the following Japan Record Awards. The total sales of Michiya Mihashi's work surpassed 100 million records in 1983, making him the first artist to achieve that in Japan.

On June 11, 1986, Sanae Jōnouchi, a member of idol group Onyanko Club, released the enka single "Ajisai Bashi", written by Yasushi Akimoto. The single debuted at No. 1 on the Oricon weekly single charts. Ikuzo Yoshi's 1986 single "Yukiguni" became the Oricon's 300th number-one single in 1987.

Other new enka singers around that time included Fuyumi Sakamoto and Ayako Fuji. Hibari Misora, at the age of 50, released the single "Midaregami" on December 10, 1987. "Midaregami" reached the No. 9 position on the Oricon weekly charts. Yasushi Akimoto wrote the lyrics of her 1989 single "Kawa no Nagare no Yō ni". However, she died in 1989 and the enka range expanded into the genre kayōkyoku while the genre kayōkyoku was vanishing.

Hachiro Kasuga died in 1991. As enka's traditional themes were no longer appreciated among younger Japanese and Western-style J-pop music became more popular, enka sales declined. However, the genre still had many adherents. Besides TV programs, enka could be heard in many restaurants, drinking establishments, karaoke bars and cafes. On the other hand, "bright" enka singer Yoshimi Tendo, who was ignored when the "dark" enka songs like Keiko Fuji's song "Keiko no Yume wa Yoru Hiraku" were popular, took part in the Kōhaku Uta Gassen for the first time in 1993. Other new enka singers such as Toshimi Tagawa and Fuyumi Sakamoto were also appearing on TV enka programs which kept enka alive. Taiwanese diva Teresa Teng was also singing in Japanese and covering enka songs from the 70s until she died in 1995 at the age of 42.

=== 2000s: Musical hybridity ===
Enka's popularity among younger Japanese, however, increased in the first decade of the 21st century. Kiyoshi Hikawa debuted on Nippon Columbia in 2000 with the single "Hakone Hachiri no Hanjirō", which became a smash hit. The early solo releases of then-Morning Musume member Yuko Nakazawa were also enka. In contrast, Nana Mizuki, who learned enka as a child, became a voice actress and also appeared as a singer on King Records in 2000.

On August 25, 2004, Johnny & Associates' group Kanjani Eight debuted with the Kansai-limited release of "Naniwa Iroha Bushi" under the Teichiku Records. The song was based on "Kawachi ondo" and featured rap. The song was a hit and reached No. 8 on the Oricon weekly singles chart on the strength of Kansai sales alone. Then, on September 22, 2004, "Naniwa Iroha Bushi" was released nationwide and re-debuted on the Oricon weekly singles charts at the No. 1 spot, becoming the first enka single to reach the No. 1 in seventeen years since Yujiro Ishihara's 1987 single "Kita no Tabibito" according to Oricon.

Hikawa also released the single "Hatsukoi Ressha" on February 9, 2005, which debuted at the No. 1 position on the Oricon charts, Hikawa's first number-one single on the Oricon weekly charts. Older female singer Junko Akimoto also debuted on King Records, releasing her first single "Madison-gun no Koi" on July 21, 2005. However,? her musical style was '70s kayōkyoku style.

Veteran enka singer Hiroshi Itsuki, at 58, released the single "Takasebune" on April 19, 2006, becoming his first Top 10 single in 22 years since 1984's "Nagaragawa Enka." It debuted at the number-nine position on the Oricon charts.

Hikawa's song "Ikken" won the grand prix at the 48th Japan Record Awards on December 30, 2006. Kanjani Eight was transferred to the pop/rock record label Imperial Records, the sub-label of Teichiku Records in 2007. In the same year, 80s superstar Akina Nakamori paid her respect to enka music by releasing an album of light enka songs.

Junko Akimoto released the single "Ai no Mama de…" on January 23, 2008, reaching the top of the Oricon weekly single charts in January 2009, making her, at the age of 61, the oldest solo singer to top the charts. That same year, Hikawa released two consecutive number-one singles — "Ryōkyoku Ichidai" and "Tokimeki no Rumba" — on the Oricon weekly charts. Fuyumi Sakamoto's 2009 song "Asia no Kaizoku", composed by Ayumi Nakamura, was an enka song featuring rock music. Sakamoto said, "If Ayumi sings the song, it's a rock song. If I sing the song, however, it's an enka song." (Note: Original text: "この曲もあゆみさんが歌ったらロックなのに、私が歌ったら、演歌になる")

=== 2010s ===
On January 1, 2010, 73-year-old Saburō Kitajima released the single "Fūfu Isshō" (夫婦一生, lit. "Couple in a Lifetime"), emerging at No. 10 on the Oricon weekly charts, making him the first solo artist to reach the Top 10 in his 70s. After Fuyumi Sakamoto appeared on Masahiro Nakai's TV program Nakai Masahiro no Kinyōbi no Sumatachi e on March 19, 2010, her double A-side single "Mata Kimi ni Koi Shiteru/Asia no Kaizoku" reached the Top 10 for the first time, ranked at No. 9 on the Oricon charts. The single became her first Top 10 single in 21 years since "Otoko no Jōwa", which had ranked in the Top 10 on the Oricon charts in 1989.

== International popularity ==
Enka has had a strong influence on music in Taiwan, which was once a Japanese colony. The first non-Japanese singer of enka was Sarbjit Singh Chadha from India. His enka album was released in 1975 and became a success in Japan, selling 150,000 copies. He went back to India a few years later, but returned to Japan in 2008.

In 2002, Yolanda Tasico became the first Filipino enka singer, going to Japan with her singles "Shiawase ni Narō", "Nagai Aida", and many others.

In China, this form of music was prohibited during the Cultural Revolution because Mao Zedong considered it hedonistic and in opposition to the socialist cause.

== See also ==
- Group Sounds
- Hokkien pop
- Music of Japan
- Music of Taiwan
- Trot (music)
