= Hideo Murata =

Murata Hideo 村田 英雄
- Born: Isamu Kajiyama; January 17, 1929; Ukiha, Fukuoka, Japan
- Died: June 13, 2002 (aged 73)
- Genres: Enka, Rōkyoku
- Occupation: Singer
- Years active: 1958–2002
- Label: Columbia Music Entertainment

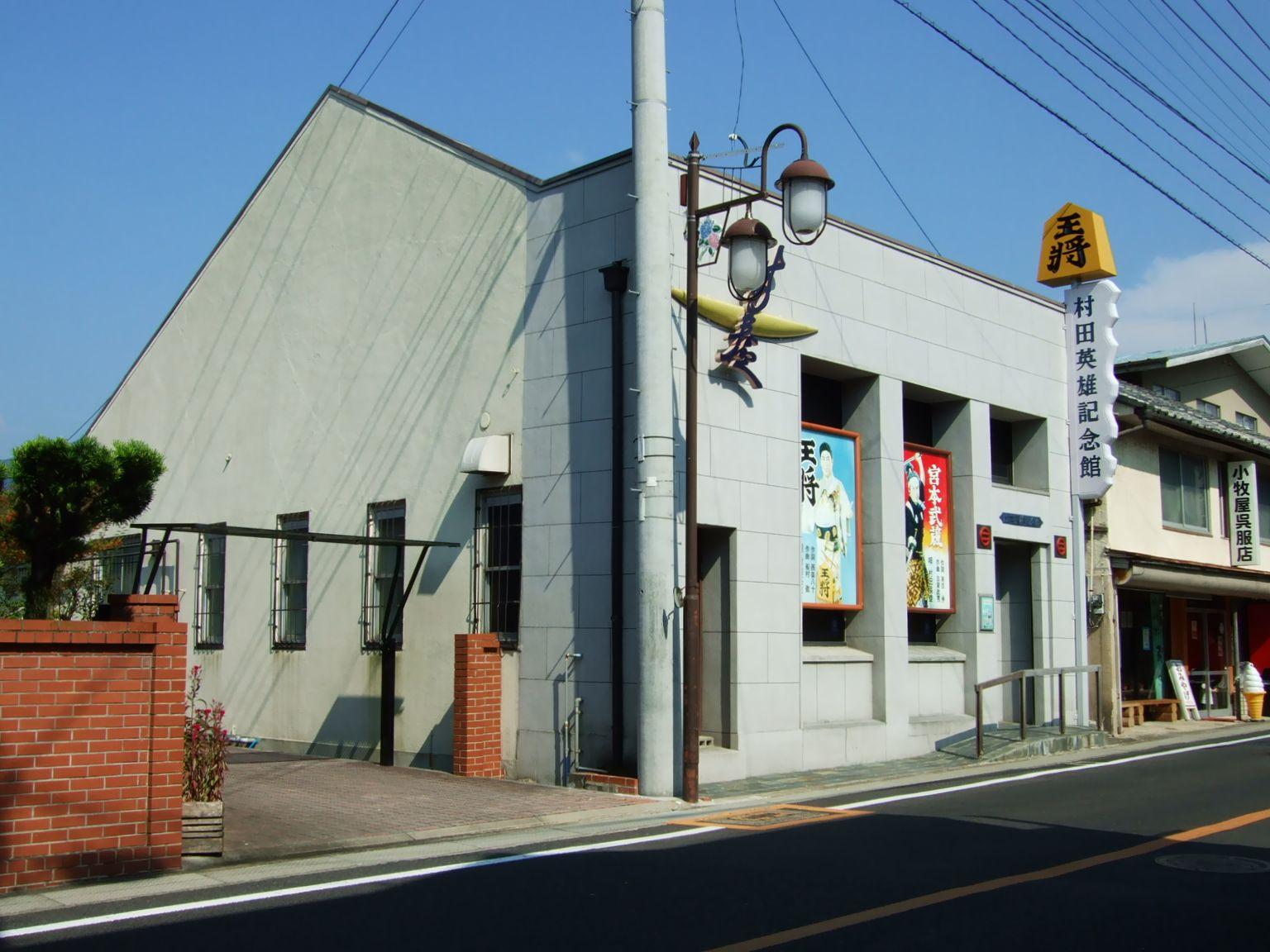
Memorial Hall of Hideo Murata in Ōchi, Saga

Hideo Murata (村田英雄, Murata Hideo; January 17, 1929 – June 13, 2002) was a Japanese rōkyoku and enka singer. He took part in the Kōhaku Uta Gassen 27 times.

Murata was born as a son of rōkyoku singer Senyu Hirosawa (広沢仙遊, Hirosawa Senyū) and Tsutako Yano (矢野ツタ子, Yano Tsutako). However, he was immediately adopted by Sumiko Deriba (出利葉スミ子, Deriba Sumiko) and Haruo Kajiyama (梶山春雄, Kajiyama Haruo) became his stepfather. His real name was Isamu Kajiyama (梶山勇, Kajiyama Isamu). He studied rōkyoku under one of Kumoemon Tochuken's disciples, Kumo Sakai.

Murata was scouted by Masao Koga, debuting with "Muhōmatsu no Isshō" (無法松の一生, lit. "Life of Outlaw Pine") in 1958. His 1961 single "Ōshō" sold over one million copies. Along with Hachiro Kasuga and Michiya Mihashi, he became a famous enka singer and Haruo Minami was regarded as his rival. He died on June 13, 2002.
