= Yoshida Naramaru =

Yoshida Naramaru (吉田奈良丸) is a name taken on by several rōkyoku singers. Yoshida Naramaru II (July 27, 1879 - January 20, 1967) was a notable rōkyoku, or streetcorner singer of the late nineteenth century in Japan. The type of singing practiced by Naramura diffused throughout the country, and its origin can be traced to the Osaka metropolis. Whether Naramura himself was responsible for the diffusion of this unique musical type, or whether he was only a part of the tradition is uncertain, but what could be said at least is that he achieved a degree of reputation as a singer of this genre.
