= Rōkyoku =

Traditional Japanese narrative singing genre

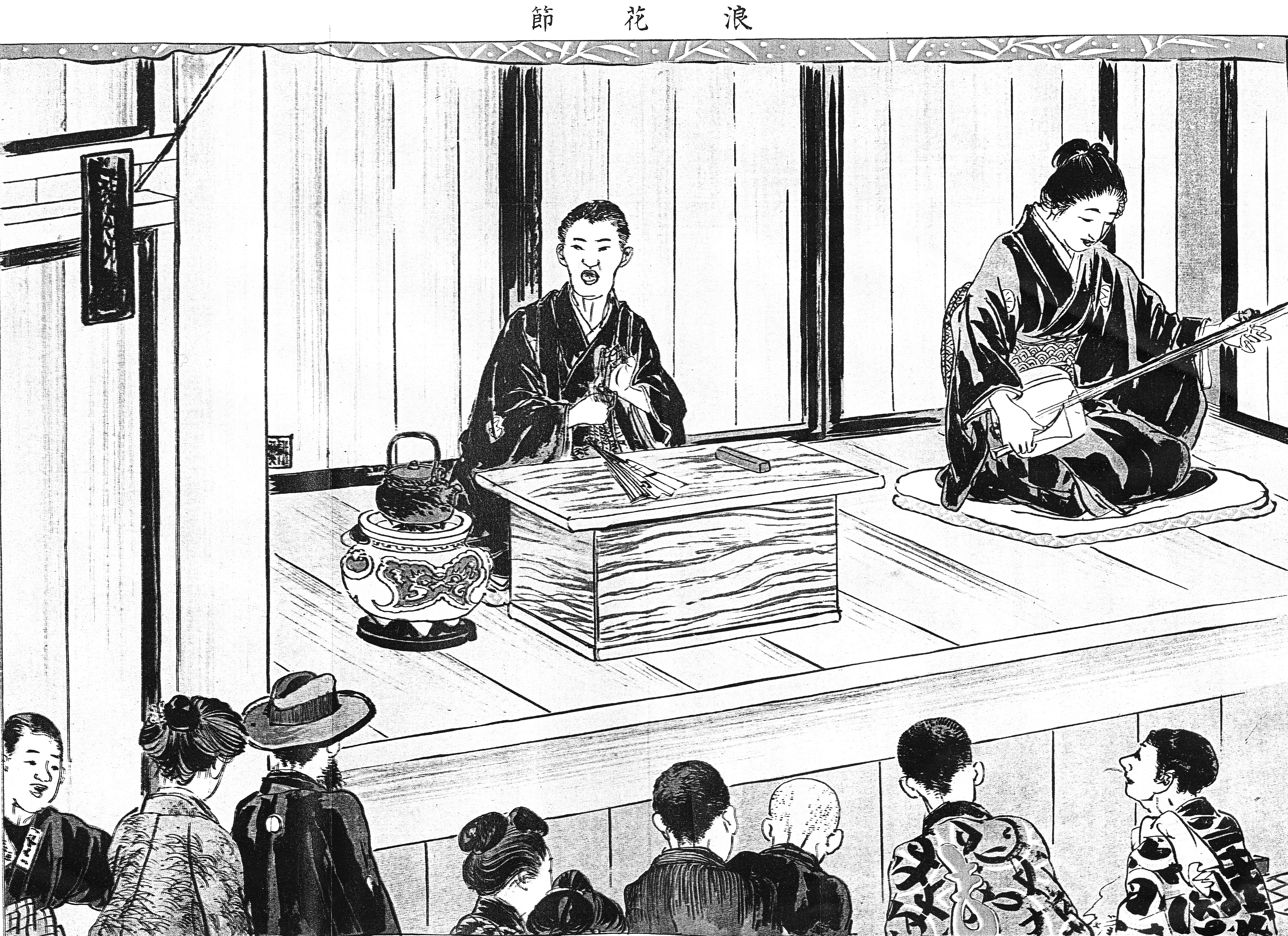
A scene of recitation in a hall

Rōkyoku (浪曲; also historically called naniwa-bushi, 浪花節) is a genre of traditional Japanese narrative singing. This genre is performed by a singer accompanied by a shamisen, rōkyoku became very popular in Japan during the first half of the 20th century.

In modern Japanese slang, naniwabushi is sometimes used to mean "a sob story", since the songs were often about sad subjects. The stories were commonly about folktales and myths with themes of loyalty and human emotion. It shares roots with older narratives such as jōruri, sekkyō-bushi and kowaka emerged alongside kōdan and rakugo as dominant narrative arts during its peak popularity.

There are two types of naniwa-bushi: Kanto-bushi which was found mostly in east Tokyo and Kansai-bushi, derived from ukare-bushi from West Osaka.

== Performance style ==
In a rōkyoku performance, the rōkyokushi (singer) will deliver the narrative singing in the centre of the stage, with a blend of sung sections (fushi) and spoken word (tanka). The kyokushi (shamisen player) accompanies the singer and plays along. The rōkyokushi will try to captivate and engage with the audience.

== Instruments ==
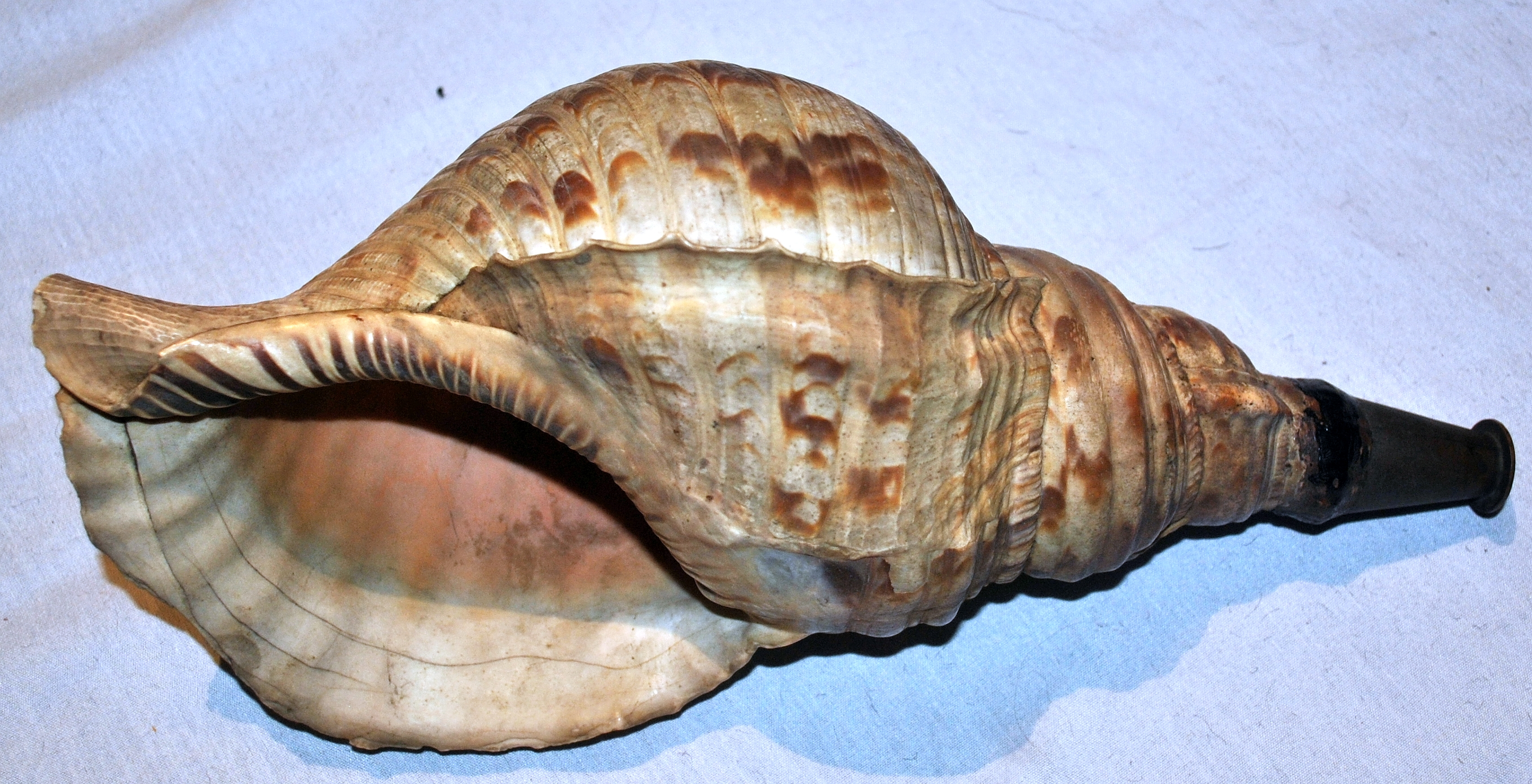
Shell trumpet

- Yamabushi
- Horagai
- Shakujo

== Origins and history ==
Rōkyoku originated from the streets of Tokyo during the early Meiji period. It later evolved into popular entertainment which was watched by various social classes. By the end of the Meiji period, Rōkyoku was gaining attention across Japan and becoming a part of the nations culture. During the Edo period, performers were part of socially marginalized groups called the eta-hinin (穢多非人), or "lowborn people."

=== Hierarchy ===
During the late Edo period a hierarchy of performances was formed:

- Kadozukegei: Door-to-door performances, religious mendicants.
- Daidogei: Performed in outdoor locations such as shrines and urban plazas.
- Yoshizubari: Temporary structures in public spaces, where performers could not charge a fixed fee.
- Theatre Performances: Performed in theatres, ranging from small variety halls (yose) to large theaters (Kabuki-za)

By 1947, rōkyokushi (singers) were among the top entertainers in industry. It is estimated that there were about 3,000 performers at its peak. However, the popularity of rōkyoku began to decline during the postwar era and was overshadowed by Western entertainment.

== Recordings ==
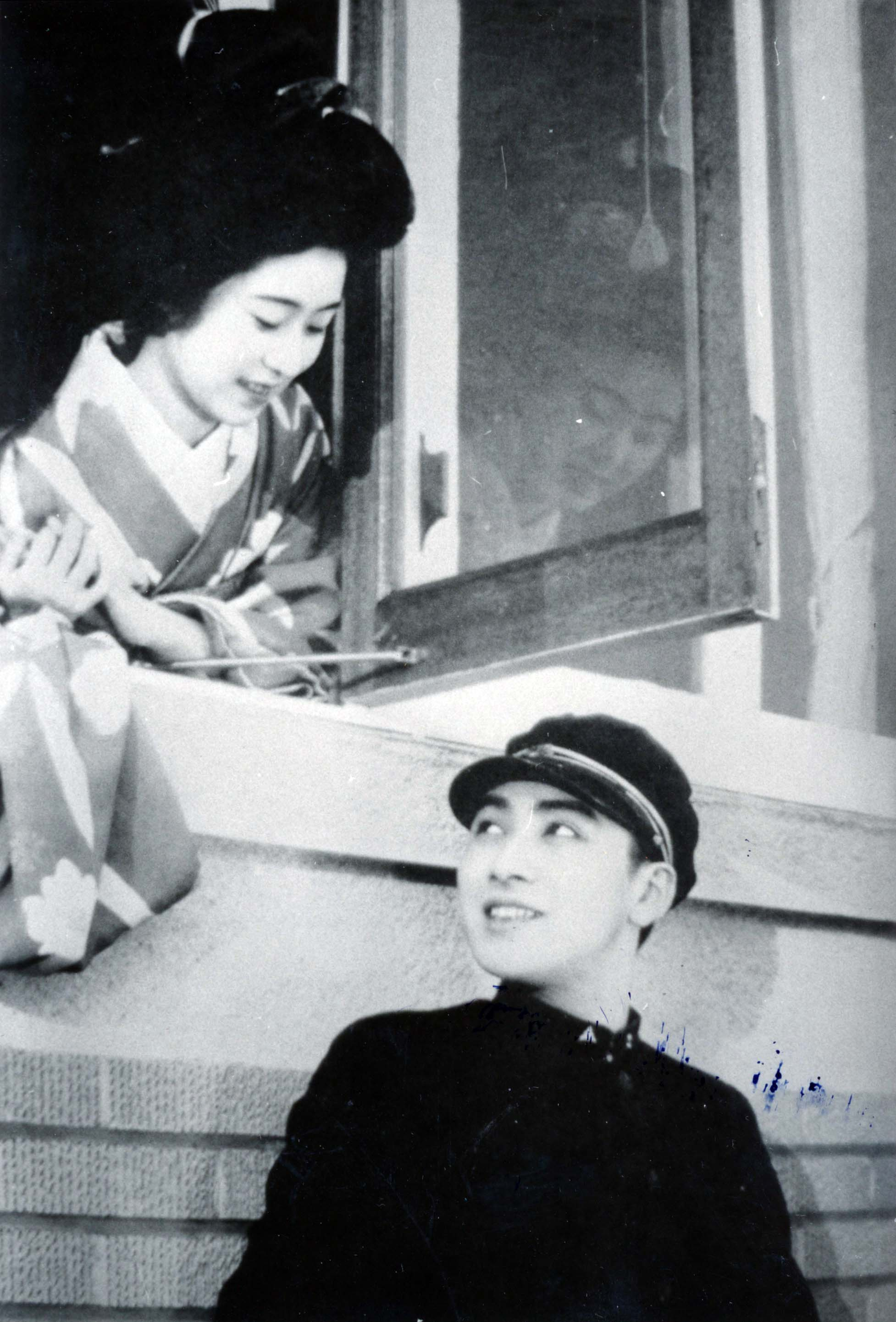
Konjiki Yasha film cover (1937)

By the 1930s Rōkyoku was entering its peak and was one of the most popular genres in Japan. Many Rōkyoku films were produced during this period that incorporated storytelling like popular film Konjiki Yasha (金色夜叉) written by Ozaki Kōyō and directed by Hiroshi Shimizu. Rōkyoku was broadcast the radio all over Japan and started to become more popular among the lower and middle class.

=== Audio recordings ===
- https://www.youtube.com/watch?v=Wb6PnUllUN8
- https://www.youtube.com/watch?v=ZrFamBf6JjA
- https://www.youtube.com/watch?v=oiC4UqeBfAQ
- https://www.youtube.com/watch?v=pPXJyf3Hl7Y

== Notable performers ==
- Takeharu Kunimoto
- Kumoemon Tochuken
- Yoshida Naramaru
- Haruo Minami
- Hideo Murata
- Ichirō Satsuki
- Haruno Yuriko
