= Michiya Mihashi =

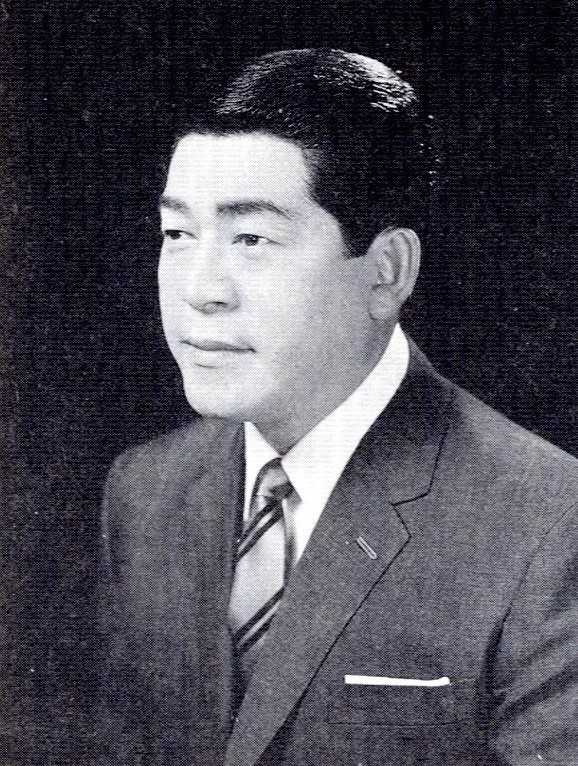

Background information
- Also known as: Michiya Mihashi 三橋 美智也
- Born: Michiya Kitazawa 北沢 美智也; November 10, 1930; Hokkaido, Japan
- Died: January 8, 1996 (aged 65) Osaka, Japan
- Genres: Min'yō, Enka
- Occupation: Singer
- Years active: 1954–1996
- Label: King Records

Michiya Mihashi (三橋美智也 Mihashi Michiya, November 10, 1930 – January 8, 1996), born Michiya Kitazawa (北沢 美智也 Kitazawa Michiya) in Kamiiso, Hokkaidō, was an enka singer in postwar Japan. Along with Hachiro Kasuga and Hideo Murata, he was regarded as one of the most notable singers to have established the genre enka.

Mihashi was among the leading Enka singers in his time and was known for his high-pitched and elastic singing voice. He recorded around 2,500 songs. By 1983, he sold more than 100 million records.

Takashi Hosokawa was his pupil.

== Biography ==
Mihasa began his career as a singer of Japanese folk music or min'yō, winning a min'yō competition in his native Hokkaidō at age 11. In 1954, he made his record debut with the song "Sake no Nigasayo" (酒の苦さよ). His 1955 song "Onna Sendō Uta" (おんな船頭唄) became a hit song.

In 1960, he sang the theme song for the tokusatsu series Kaiketsu Harimao, which was created by Shotaro Ishinomori.

In the latter half of the 1970s he reinvented himself, adopting a 'rough' style and hosting a radio program aimed at young men, from whom he acquired the nickname "Michie" (ミッチー). In 1983, he set a record by becoming the first Japanese singer in history to sell one hundred million records.

Mihasa died in hospital in Osaka on January 8, 1996, from multiple organ failure at the age of 65.

== Discography ==
- "Onna Sendo Uta" (おんな船頭唄, Female Waterman Song) : 1955
- "Ah Shinsengumi" (あゝ新撰組) : 1955
- "Ringo Mura Kara" (リンゴ村から, From Apple Village) : 1956
- "Aishu Ressha" (哀愁列車, Melancholy Train) : 1956
- "Kojo" (古城, Old Castle) : 1959
- "Takeda Bushi" (武田節) : 1961
- "Tsugaru Jongara Bushi" (with Takeshi Terauchi & Bunnys) : 1967

== See also ==
- Best selling music artists
