= Haruo Minami =

Japanese singer (1923–2001)

- 三波春夫
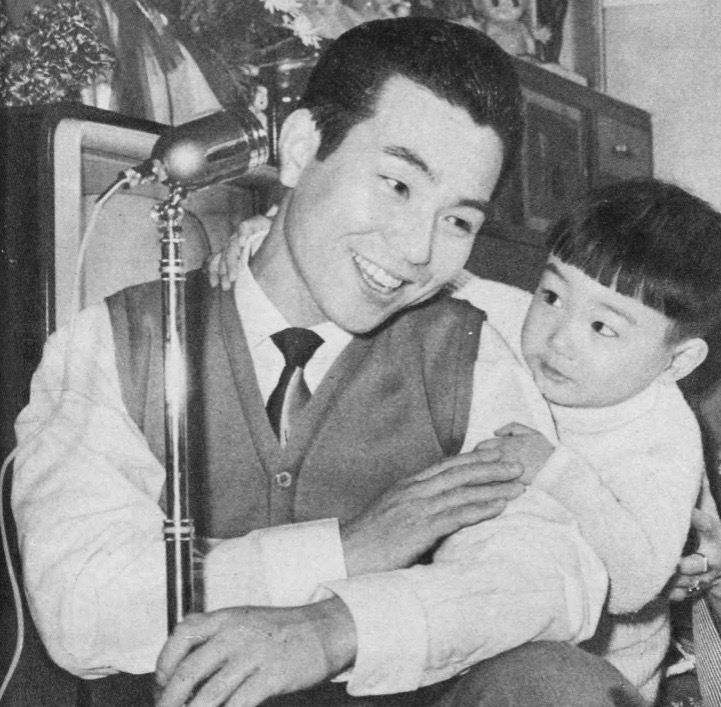
- Born: Bunji Kitazume; July 19, 1923; Nagaoka, Niigata, Empire of Japan
- Died: April 14, 2001 (aged 77); Tokyo, Japan
- Other name: Fumiwaka Nanjo
- Occupation: enka singer
- Spouse: Yuki Kitazume (m. 1952–2001)

Haruo Minami (三波春夫, Minami Haruo; July 19, 1923 – April 14, 2001), born Bunji Kitazume (北詰文司, Kitazume Bunji), was a Japanese enka singer and rōkyoku performer. His song "Tokyo Gorin Ondo" was the theme song of the 1964 Summer Olympics.

== Early life ==
He was born Bunji Kitazume in Nagaoka, Niigata, Japan.

== Career ==
In 1939, at the age of 16, Bunji debuted as a performer of rōkyoku, a type of narrative singing, under the name Fumiwaka Nanjo (南條文若, Nanjō Fumiwaka).

Bunji joined the Imperial Japanese Army in 1944 and was sent to Manchuria. He was captured by the Red Army and spent four years at a prisoner of war camp near Khabarovsk. He returned to Japan in 1949 and resumed his career as a rōkyoku singer.

He adopted his stage name Haruo Minami in 1957 and started performing popular music (only later would his music be classified as enka, a term not in existence at the time of his debut). He attracted attention for performing while dressed in kimono, which was unheard of for male pop singers at the time. Hideo Murata was regarded as his rival as they both came from rōkyoku backgrounds. Among his many hit songs was "Tokyo Gorin Ondo", the theme song of the 1964 Summer Olympics in Tokyo. It sold over one and a half million copies, and was awarded a gold disc.

In 1992, Minami enjoyed a popularity resurgence when he performed the ending music for the Fuji Television series Super Zugan. Previously popular primarily among adults, enka music gained many younger fans due to this song.

== Death ==
On April 14, 2001, Minami died of prostate cancer at a hospital in Tokyo, at the age of 77.

== Approach to audience ==
Haruo Minami is known for popularizing the saying "Okyakusama wa kamisama desu". It is directly translated, "The guests are kami", meaning "the customer is always right" or "the customer is a god" symbolising patronage. When he sang his songs, he was concentrating as if to pray before kami. He looked on his audience as kami to make his performance perfect. His words were spread by Let's-Go-Sanbiki, a trio of Japanese comedian that had come to watch Minami's show.

In October 2016 his voice was released for software synthesizer CeVIO Creative Studio.
