= Saburō Kitajima =

Japanese enka singer, lyricist and composer

Saburō Kitajima 北島 三郎
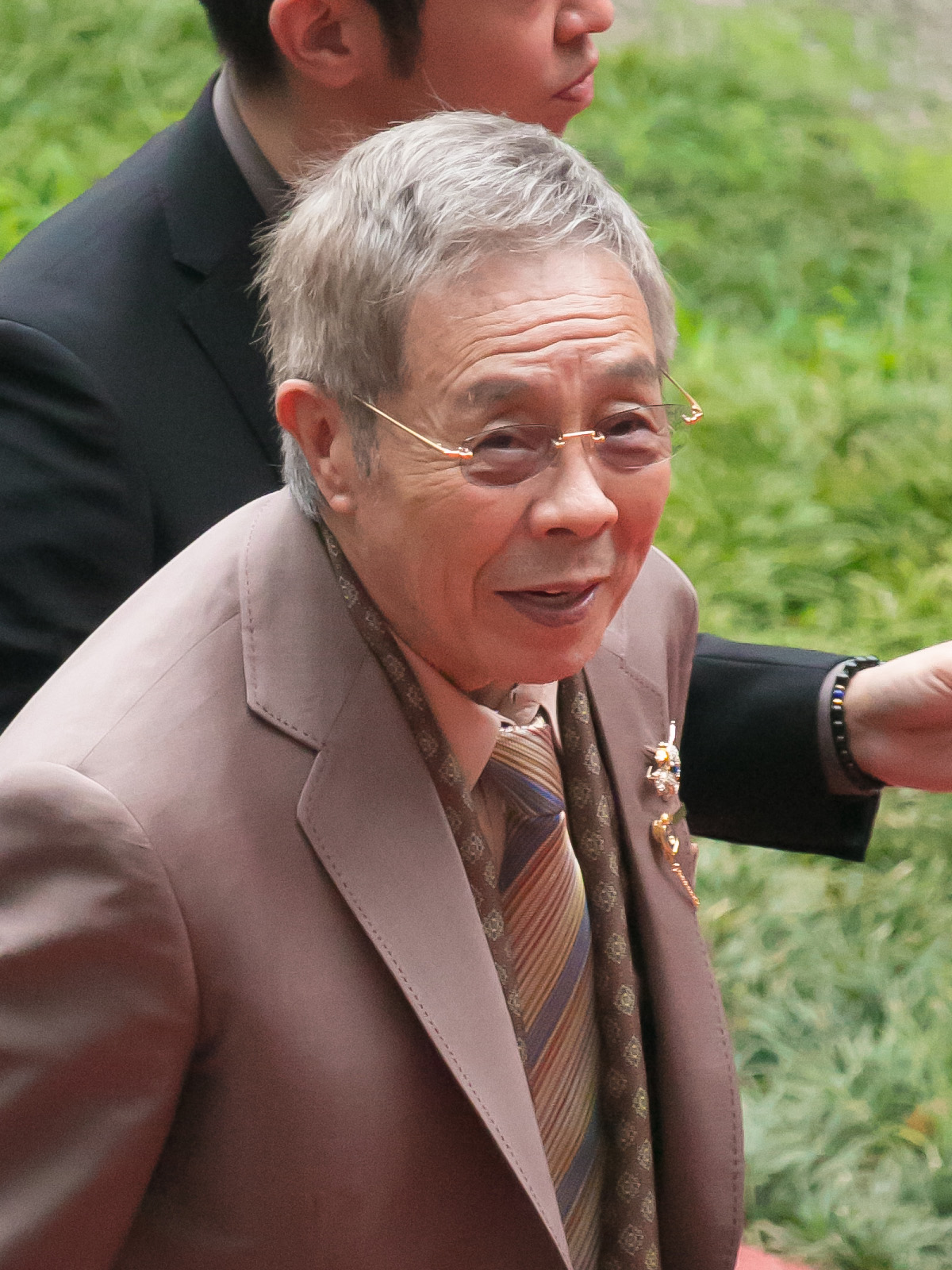
- Kitajima in 2017

Background information
- Born: 大野 穣 (Ōno Minoru); October 4, 1936 (age 89); Shiriuchi, Hokkaido, Japan
- Genres: Enka
- Occupations: Singer, lyricist, composer, actor
- Years active: 1962–present
- Labels: Nippon Columbia (1962–1963); Nippon Crown (1963–present)
- Website: www.kitajima-music.co.jp

Saburō Kitajima (北島 三郎, Kitajima Saburō; born October 4, 1936) is a Japanese enka singer, lyricist, actor and composer.

== Background ==
He was born Minoru Ōno (大野 穣), in Shiriuchi, Hokkaidō, to a fisherman. He was very poor due to the effects of World War II, and was forced to work while he studied.

== Music career ==
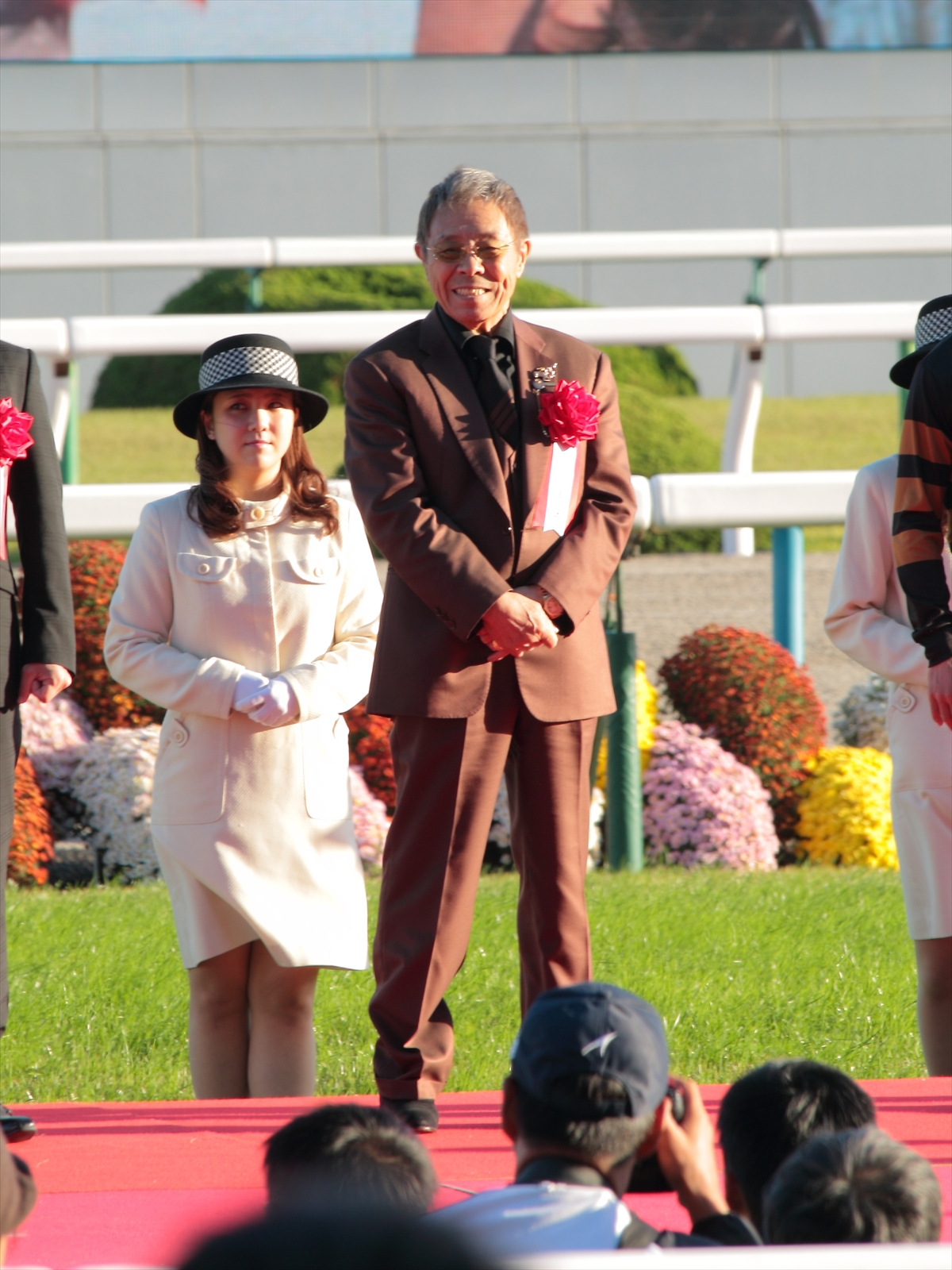
Kitajima in 2015.

When he was about to graduate from high school, he decided to become a singer. His debut single was called "Bungacha-Bushi," which was released in 1962.

He has many famous songs, including "Namida Bune" (1962), "Kyōdai Jingi" (1965), "Yosaku" (1978) and "Kita no Ryōba" (1986). His 1965 song "Kaerokana" was written by lyricist Rokusuke Ei and composer Hachidai Nakamura. He is very popular in Japan partly due to his looks of a physical laborer, and he mostly sings in the spirit of Japan's working class and rural laborers.

Kitajima regularly appeared on Kōhaku Uta Gassen, an annual end-of-year TV program where many major Japanese singers gather to perform, before announcing his retirement from the show in 2013. He participated a record 50 times, was the "anchor" (final solo performer) 13 times and led the grand finale 11 times. His participation included the infamous DJ Ozma performance at the 57th NHK Kōhaku Uta Gassen. He returned at the 69th NHK Kōhaku Uta Gassen in 2018 for a special performance.

Kitajima released single "Fūfu Isshō" (夫婦一生, lit. "Couple in a Lifetime") on January 1, 2010 at the age of 73. It debuted at No. 10 on the Japanese Oricon weekly single charts. It became the first single to reach Top 10 by a solo artist in his 70s in Oricon charts history.

He does a lot of concerts overseas and is contributing a lot of work to the culture of Japanese music.

== Other activities ==
In addition to his singing career, Kitajima acted in the role of Tatsugorō on the television series Abarenbō Shōgun. During the quarter-century life of the series, he also sang its theme songs. He is also the owner of many thoroughbred racehorses, most notably Kitasan Black.

== Honours ==
- Order of the Rising Sun, 4th Class, Gold Rays with Rosette (2016)
