= Hachiro Kasuga =

Japanese singer (1924–1991)

Kasuga Hachirō 春日 八郎
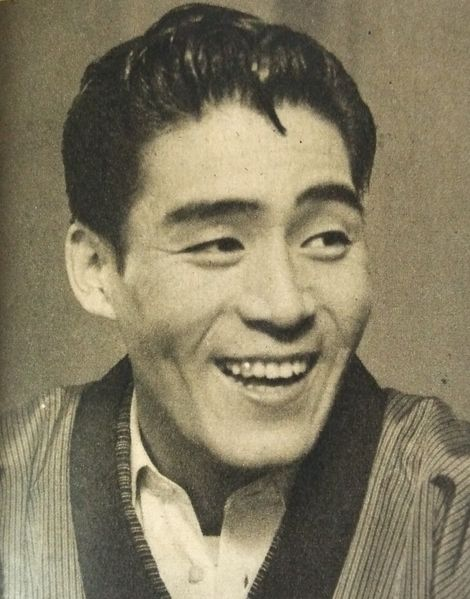
- Kasuga Hachiro in 1954

Background information
- Born: Minoru Watabe; October 9, 1924; Aizubange, Fukushima, Japan
- Died: October 22, 1991 (aged 67)
- Genres: Enka
- Occupation: Singer
- Years active: 1947–1991
- Label: King Records

Hachiro Kasuga (春日八郎, Kasuga Hachirō; October 9, 1924 – October 22, 1991), born Minoru Watabe, was a Japanese enka singer. He has been dubbed "the first enka singer".

Having seen Ichiro Fujiyama on stage, he attempted to become a popular singer. After he graduated from the Toyo Music School, he was drafted into the Imperial Japanese Army in 1944, and returned from Taiwan in 1946. He joined Shinjuku Moulin Rouge in 1947 and then King Records in 1949.

In 1952, Kasuga made his debut with the song "Akai lamp no Shū Ressha" (赤いランプの終列車, lit. "Last Train with Red Lamp"), which at first got into the news in Nagoya. His popularity soon became widespread. His 1954 song "Otomi-san" (お富さん, lit. "Miss Otomi") became more successful throughout Japan. This single sold 500,000 copies in a half year, and eventually sold more than one million copies.

In 1955, he also released the single "Wakare no Ipponsugi" (別れの一本杉, lit. "Farewell One Cedar") which he musically sought. The song was composed by Toru Funamura. His music, which was later called enka, had much effect on subsequent popular music of Japan.

He died on October 22, 1991, aged 67.
