= Shōwa Modan =

Early 20th century Japanese artistic and aesthetic style

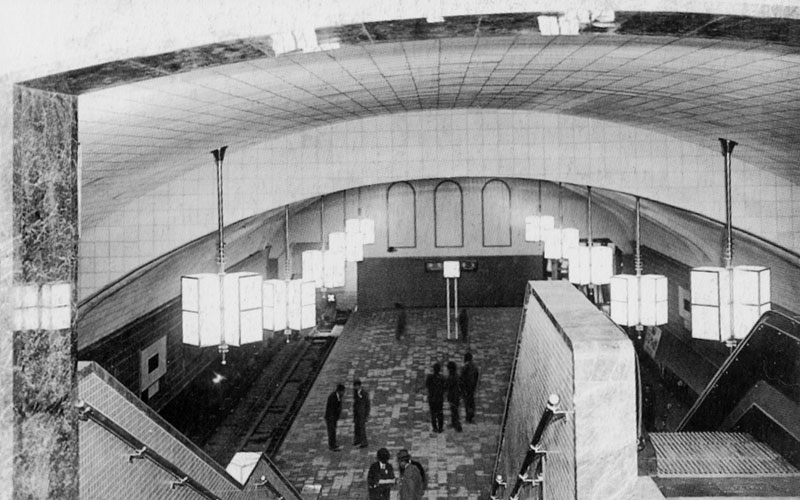
Art Deco-style platform of Osaka Municipal Subway Umeda Station in the 1930.

Shōwa modan or Shōwa Modern (Japanese: 昭和モダン) was a style of visual arts, design, architecture, and music that was a fusion between Japanese and Western styles which emerged in the early Shōwa era during the interwar period.

== History ==
=== After World War I ===
As Japan — victorious from World War I, and the only developed nation in Asia — entered the Shōwa era in 1926, a mass consumption society began in earnest, mainly in the large cities such as Tokyo, Yokohama, Osaka, and Kobe. European and American companies entered the market one after another, aiming at the vigorous Japanese market.

On one hand, styles that combine functionality and beauty, such as Art Nouveau and Art Deco, which blossomed in Europe around 1910, permeated Japan. Popular music such as chanson in France, jazz and Charleston popular in the United States, and Argentine tango sung by Carlos Gardel, were heard by many people due to the spread of gramophones and the start of radio broadcasting.

On the other hand, in the early days of Hollywood movies, movies starring comedians such as Charlie Chaplin and Buster Keaton, and actresses such as Greta Garbo and Marlene Dietrich, could be seen as entertainment in movie theaters, and American movie companies were expanding into Japan; Chaplin himself visited Japan during this period. It was also during this period that the technological innovation of cinema progressed, and the transition from silent films to talkie films was made.

During this period when popular culture flourished, classical musicians, pianists, and singers active at the time, such as Arturo Toscanini, Sergei Rachmaninoff, Alfred Cortot, Enrico Caruso, and Tino Rossi also became popular in Japan; Kosaku Yamada would welcome Rachmaninoff's arrival in Japan later.

=== Domestic customs ===
In this way, while new cultures and consumerism of Europe and America were flowing in and being accepted, a culture that independently digested the modern influences unique to the West and Japan had been cultivated, mainly in the large cities in Japan.

Continuing from the Taishō era, Yumeji Takehisa's paintings of bijin and Kasho Takabatake's illustrations of beautiful boys and girls gained immense popularity; and due to Japan's unique high literacy rate, lyrical poems written by Hakushū Kitahara and Yaso Saijō were much read and sung. In addition, general interest magazines such as Kaizō, Kingu, and Bungei Shunjū, and low-priced book series known as Iwanami Bunko and Yen-pon were published, which advanced the popularization of culture.

Shinkankakuha literature such as those of Yasunari Kawabata and Riichi Yokomitsu, and popular literature such as those of Eiji Yoshikawa and Kaizan Nakazato appeared. In magazines such as Shinseinen, mysterious fantasy works such as those of Edogawa Ranpo and Yumeno Kyūsaku, or a style called Ero guro nansensu, prevailed during this period (the pioneer in this field was Jun'ichirō Tanizaki during the Taishō era), and Kōnosuke Hinatsu introduced romantic and gothic poetry patterned after English literature. Entertainment works for children such as Ōgon Bat, Fuku-chan, Norakuro, and the Shōnen tantei dan ("Boy Detectives Club") series became extremely popular.

In addition, period drama stars such as Kanjūrō Arashi, Denjirō Ōkōchi, and Tsumasaburō Bandō appeared in movies, while composers such as Ryōichi Hattori, Masao Koga and Shinpei Nakayama, and singers such as Noriko Awaya, Ichirō Fujiyama, Taro Shoji, Dick Mine, etc. were active in the field of music. Japanese Americans such as Kawabata Fumiko, Betty Inada, and Bucky Shirakata were active with authentic jazz and Hawaiian music, another characteristic of this period.

The construction rush of big theaters occurred: Oriental Theater, Nihon Theater, Tokyo Theater, Takarazuka Grand Theater, Tokyo Takarazuka Theater, and Hibiya Movie Theater were built in city centers.

== New life ==
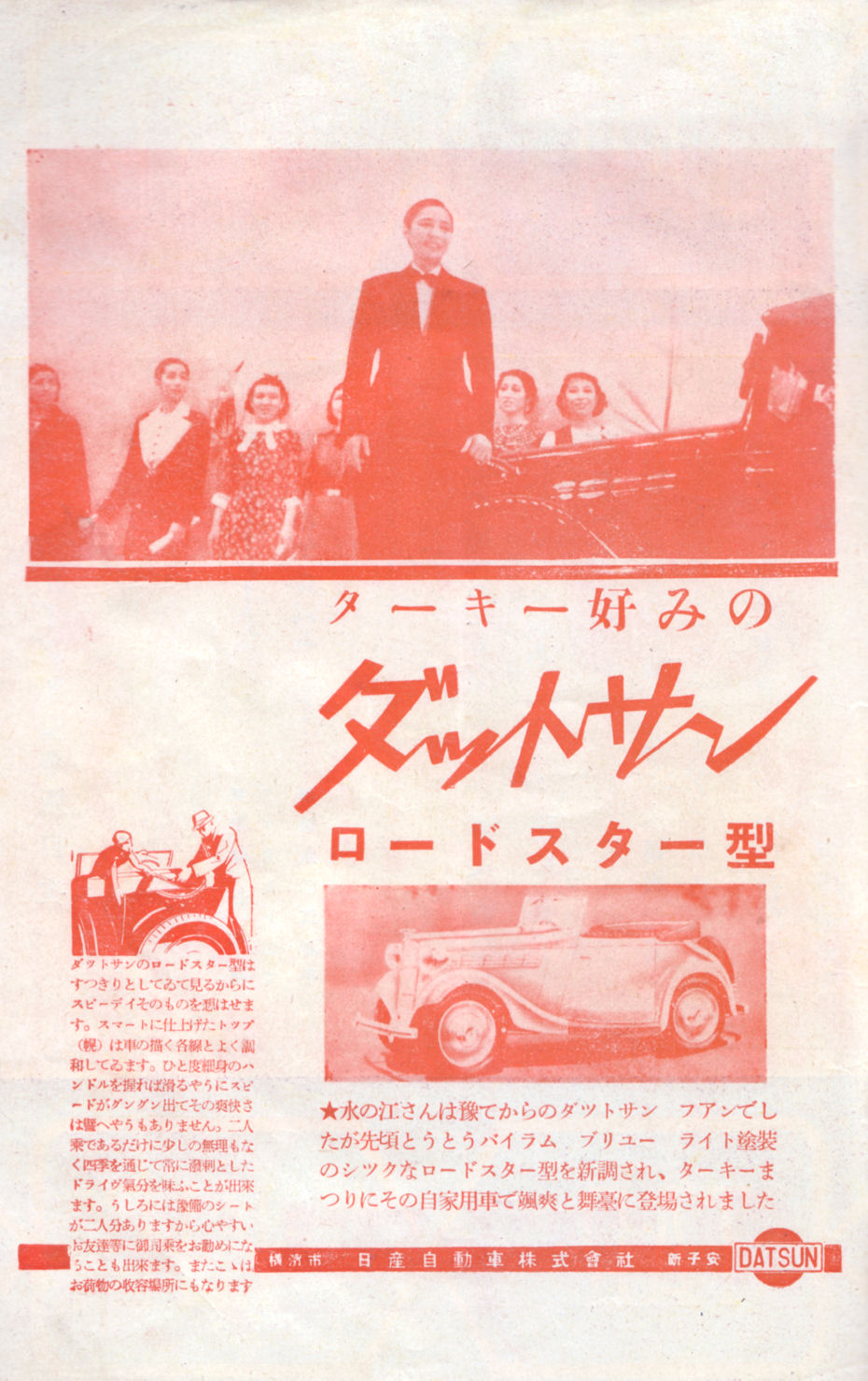
Datsun advertisement featuring Takiko Mizunoe

In addition, the lifestyle changed drastically, and from the time of the 1928 Japanese general election (which introduced universal male suffrage) onwards, it became common for some workers to abandon women's kimono (Japanese clothes) and Nihongami (Japanese hair), in favor of Western clothing, cut hair, and hats. In the cities, women were advancing in the society, and professional women such as typists, female bus conductors (known as "bus girls"), and waitresses appeared. Women in cutting-edge Western clothing came to be called "modern girls" (moga) (there was also a male version known as "modern boy" (mobo)).

Houses were built on lands along railway lines developed as commuter transport by railway companies, and people living there would travel to terminal station department stores (Note: Meaning department stores built above railway terminals.) or by private cars for shopping trips during holidays; it was from the early Shōwa era that middle-class citizens' lives became commonplace.

The main department stores that opened during this period included Hankyu Department Store (the world's first terminal station department store), Mitsukoshi, and Daimaru. Constructions of subways had begun in city centers; the first subway in Japan, the Tokyo Subway (currently the Ginza Line) opened in 1927, followed by the Osaka Municipal Subway (Midōsuji Line) in 1933.

It was also around this time that entrepreneurs returning from the West opened Western-style restaurants which became successful in city centers. The cafés at that time were mainly patronized by single men, and were popular due to their modernity. The Western-fusion menu which is standard today, such as curried rice, omelette rice, and cutlets, were favorites. It was also a time when many food and drink products which are still loved today, such as children's lunch, Morinaga Milk Caramel, Mitsuya Cider, Calpis, instant coffee, and Suntory Whisky, were developed.

In the development along the railway lines mentioned above, the modern garden city constructions of Ichizō Kobayashi of Hankyu Railway and Nezu Kaichirō of Tobu Railway were well known. Modernist architecture and Art Deco style were touted, particularly in the Osaka Bay area where these were associated with Hanshinkan Modernism. Yodokō Guest House, Kōshien Hotel, Dōjunkai apartments, St. Luke's International Hospital (old hospital building), Isetan’s Shinjuku store, Tokyo Metropolitan Teien Art Museum, etc. were built during this period.

== The end of Shōwa Modan ==
The rise of militarism after the May 15 Incident and the February 26 Incident, the end of party politics during the latter half of the 1930s, the intensification of the Second Sino-Japanese War which broke out in 1937, and the tension of global international relations, had resulted in the National Mobilization Law and the abandonment of the Tokyo Olympics in 1938. World War II began in Europe in 1939.

Afterwards these cultures were dismissed as "soft and luxurious" and "anti-'new system' ", and Shōwa Modan had come to an end, but until the start of the war against Britain and the United States in 1941, Western movies, music, clothes, etc. remained very popular, and even after that, Western food, theater, and baseball were still popular.

== See also ==
- Taishō Roman
