= Kita Rentarō =

Japanese singer (1920–1940)

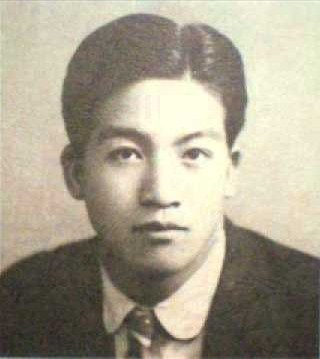
- Portrait of Kita from a 78 RPM lyric sheet.

Background information
- Also known as: Kita Kan, Kitaren
- Born: Kita Koretsugu; March 20, 1920; Tokyo, Empire of Japan
- Died: September 16, 1940 (aged 20) Tokyo, Empire of Japan
- Genres: Ryūkōka
- Occupation: Singer
- Years active: 1936–1940
- Labels: Taihei Records, Polydor Records

Kita Rentarō (北廉太郎) (also known as Kita Kan (紀多寛); born Kita Koretsugu (紀太惟次); March 20, 1920 – September 16, 1940) was a Japanese ryūkōka singer. He was popularly known as Kitaren (キタレン).

Tending towards delinquency in adolescence, Kita dropped out of school in 1936 and began to train as a boxer. His father's death soon after, as well as encouragement from Kikuchi Tansui, caused him to pursue singing as a vocation instead. In 1937, Kita made his recording debut on Taihei Records; he moved to the Japanese branch of Polydor Records the following year. After initial success, his career stalled. He died from leukemia in 1940 after a rapid decline in his health.

== Life ==
=== Youth ===
Kita was born on March 20, 1920, in the Ōkubo neighborhood of Tokyo. Erroneous reports of his birth in Tsuruoka, Yamagata Prefecture are attributed to the fact that his parents had registered their home there.

As an adolescent, Kita developed a strong interest in sports, as well as a reputation for being short-tempered and aggressive. He turned to delinquency and spent much of his time with similar peers in Shinjuku. During this period, he learned judo and eventually earned the rank of 4th dan. In 1936, he dropped out of school. Considered to be taller in height than the average Japanese male of the time and promisingly athletic, he began to train as a professional boxer. Shortly after starting his training, his father died; Kita abandoned boxing as a result. Instead, he decided to pursue a career in music after he was encouraged to do so by the shakuhachi player, Kikuchi Tansui, who admired Kita's voice.

=== Career ===
In November 1936, Kita made his recording debut on Taihei Records. His first 78 RPM disc, wherein he used the pseudonym "Kita Kan", included the songs "The Town's Oasis" (街のオアシス, Machi no oashisu) and "A Man's Tears" (男の涙, Otoko no namida). After recording twenty songs for Taihei, Kita left the label to join the Japanese branch of Polydor Records, where he was promoted as the next Shōji Tarō and Uehara Bin. Thereafter, Kita used the name "Kita Rentarō" professionally for the rest of his life.

Kita's first song for Polydor, "Hometown of Izu" (伊豆の故郷, Izu no furusato), composed and arranged by Kurawaka Haruo, was released in late 1938. The song was part of a minor genre of songs about the Izu Peninsula which were popular in Japan at the time. Polydor arranged for an extensive marketing campaign, which included an amateur singing contest that led to the start of Tabata Yoshio's career. This was followed by "Lullaby of the Journey" (旅の子守唄, Tabi no komoriuta), a song composed by Raymond Hattori that the music historian Hori Tōru described as a "masterpiece" that "displays the real measure of [Kita's] talent". In January 1939, Kita and Kurawaka collaborated on another hit, "Cradle of Dreams" (夢のゆりかご, Yume no yurikago). Its "apparent nihilistic tone", according to Hori, "is a reflection of its times".

By 1940, Kita had become disenchanted with Polydor. After initial success, he had difficulty establishing a niche for himself, especially after Tabata's fame began to overwhelm his own. Kita often expressed to his friends his dissatisfaction with Polydor and his desire to move to another label. Still under contract to Polydor, Kita secretly visited the studios of Television Records, a new label that had emerged at the time. Evidence indicates that he may also have visited Taihei. The matrix numbers on the song "Goodbye, Shanghai" (再見上海, Saiken Shanhai), Hori said, suggest that Kita recorded for Taihei in June 1940.

Aside from difficulties at Polydor, Kita had told friends in 1940 that his potential draft into the Second Sino-Japanese War would likely require a break from his career. That same year, he also began to manifest the symptoms of leukemia. Although he seemed to be in good health at one of his final public appearances in Shinjuku in July 1940, his health quickly deteriorated.

=== Death ===
Kita died at Keio University Hospital in Tokyo on September 16, 1940.

== Legacy ==
The singer Aoba Shōko recalled Kita as "an absolutely kind youth, who could never say 'no' whenever he was asked to do something". Another singer, Tsuruta Rokurō, described Kita as having a "wayward charm" and that he was "a little on the cynical side". Tabata remained an admirer of Kita, despite their rivalry, and continued into his later career to sing the songs that the latter had first popularized.

In an essay summing up Kita's life and career, Hori said that he regarded the singer as the forerunner of postwar Japanese teen singers and idols.
