= Yoshio Tabata =

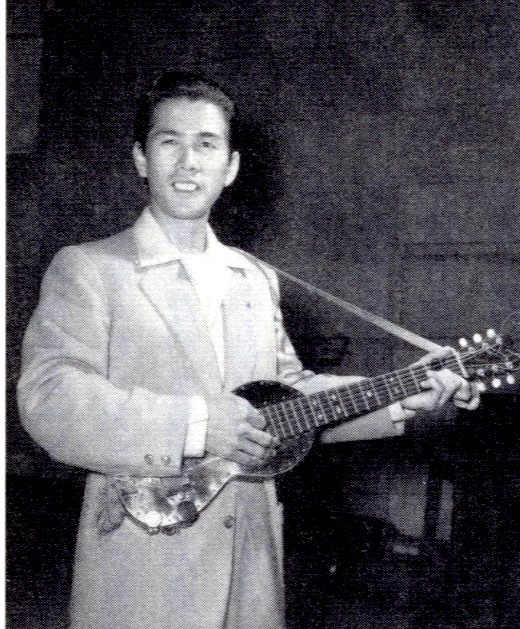

Background information
- Also known as: Bata-Yan
- Born: Yoshio Tabata; January 1, 1919; Matsusaka, Mie, Imperial Japan
- Died: April 25, 2013 (aged 94) Tokyo, Japan
- Genres: Ryūkōka; enka
- Occupations: Singer; songwriter
- Instrument: Electric guitar
- Years active: 1939–2013

Yoshio Tabata (田端義夫, Tabata Yoshio; January 1, 1919 – April 25, 2013) was a Japanese ryūkōka and enka singer, songwriter, and electric guitarist. His debut song "Shima no Funauta" (島の舟唄, literally "Island Ship Song") was released in 1939. Along with enka-shi Haruo Oka's 1939 debut, his debut had a big impact on Japanese popular music because Japanese popular ryūkōka music of that time was mainly sung by classical music singers such as Ichiro Fujiyama and Noriko Awaya. He was born in Matsusaka, Mie Prefecture, Japan.

== Discography ==
- Shima no Funauta (島の舟唄, Island Ship Song) : 1939
- Ume to Heitai (梅と兵隊, Plum and Soldier) : 1941
- Kaeri Bune (かえり船, Demobilization Ship) : 1946
- Shima Sodachi (島育ち, Growing in Island) : 1962
- Jūku no Haru (十九の春, Spring at the Age of 19) : 1975
- Shōwa San Dai ki (昭和三代記, Shōwa Three Generation Record) : 1994
- Hyaku-nen no Ai (百年の愛, Love For 100 Years) : 1998 (Tribute song to Taro Shoji born in 1898)
- Tabi no Owari ni Kiku Uta wa (旅の終わりに聞く歌は, The song heard at the trip's end is) : 2001
