= Katsutaro Kouta =

Japanese singer

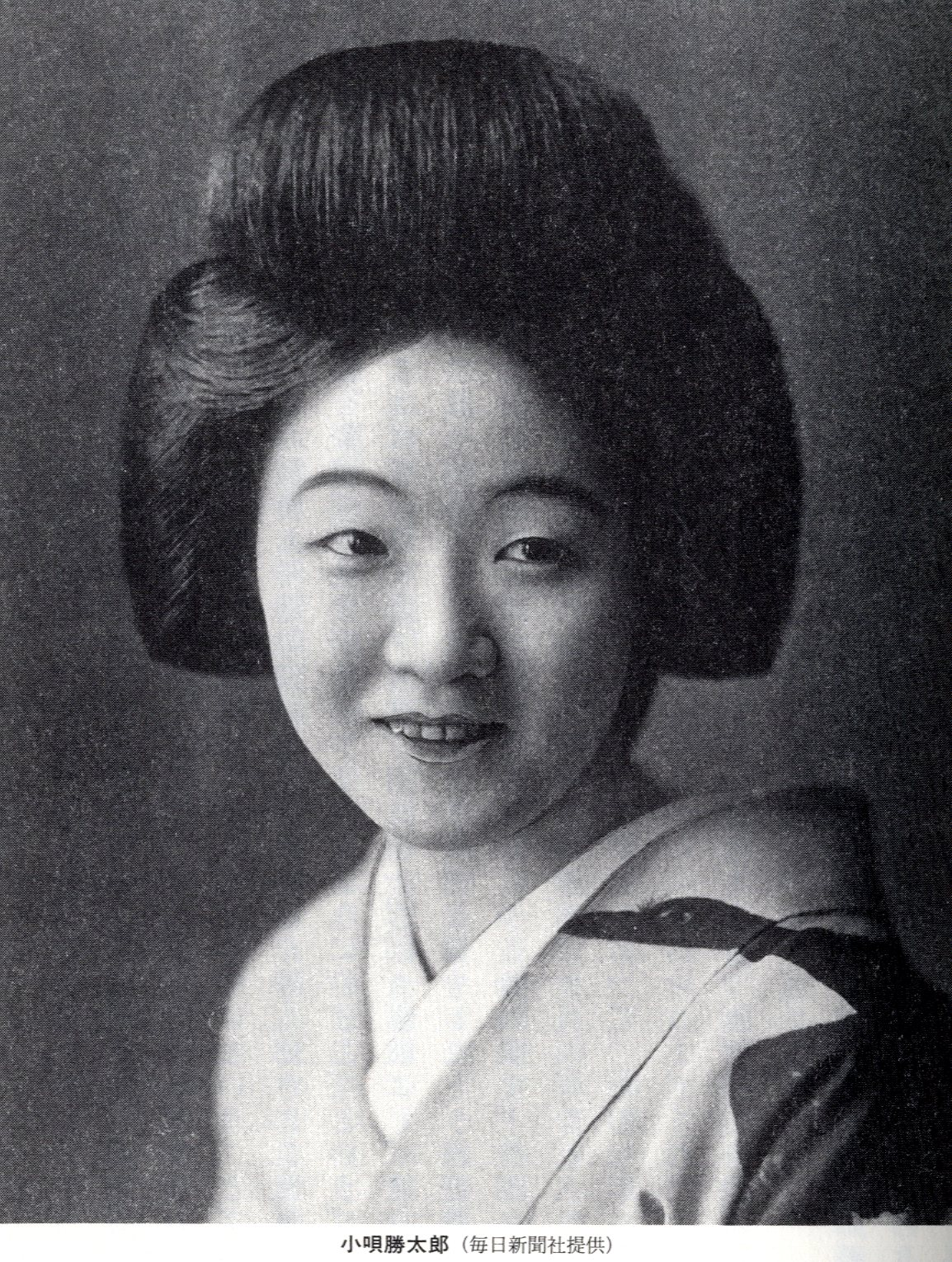

Background information
- Born: Katsu Satō; November 6, 1904; Nuttari, Niigata, Niigata, Japan
- Died: June 21, 1974 (aged 69)
- Genres: Ryūkōka, Min'yō, Hauta, Kouta, Kiyomoto
- Occupation: Singer
- Years active: 1930–1974
- Labels: Victor, Columbia, Teichiku, Toshiba

Katsutaro Kouta (小唄 勝太郎, Kouta Katsutarō; November 6, 1904 – June 21, 1974) was a Japanese female geisha and ryūkōka singer, who performed in the "New-Min'yō" style of singing. Kouta came to be most well known, alongside another popular geisha singer, Ichimaru, in the "Katsu-Ichi Era".

== Career ==
Katsutaro was born on 6 November 1904 in Niigata Nuttari-cho, Nakakanbara District, Niigata Prefecture. During her childhood, she worked as a helper at a relative's restaurant, before becoming a geisha at the age of 15. Katsutaro developed a fondness for kiyomoto, a narrative style of singing intended to accompany the shamisen; around the late Taishō period, Katsutaro moved to Tokyo, was accepted into the Yoshicho geisha district and debuted with the performing name (geimei (芸名)) of Katsutaro.

Around 1928, a geisha from the same geisha district named Fumikichi (二三吉) recorded a number of hit songs for Victor of Japan. In 1930, Katsutaro recorded some hauta and kouta songs with Odeon Record and Parlophone. A year later, she signed an exclusive contract with Victor of Japan, debuting with the song "Sado Okesa" (佐渡おけさ) in 1931. In 1932, her B-side song titled "Yanagi no Ame" ("Willow Rain") became her first hit. Katsutaro released the song "Shima no Musume" (島の娘, lit., Island Girl) in the same year, with the song becoming a big hit in 1933, selling 350,000 copies in 3 months, with a total of 600,000 copies. However, the song also angered members of the Home Ministry in its description of illicit sexual relations.

In 1933, Katsutaro and Issei Mishima released the duet "Tokyo Ondo" in June or July during Bon Festival. The song was composed by Shinpei Nakayama, selling 1.2 million copies and becoming the highest selling single in Japan at that time. Also in 1933, Katsutaro left the geisha world to concentrate on her new profession as a recording artist, dropping the Yoshicho name and becoming simply "Katsutaro", after which released another hit, "Oshima Okesa".

In the spring season of 1934, Katsutaro, Mishima Issei and Tamaki Tokuyama released the song "Sakura Ondo", which also became a big hit. In the same year, she received the name "Kouta Katsutarō" in an open exhibition. After the name change, she released more songs and became an even bigger star, with the songwriter Nagata Mikihiko (長田幹彦) dubbing her and rival geisha artist Ichimaru as "Emotional Katsutaro and Intellectual Ichimaru"; the time period of the mid 1930s when both were active and popular recording artists is known as the "Katsu-Ichi Jidai" (勝市時代) (lit., "Katsu-Ichi Era").

In the late 1930s, she and other singers were called to China to perform for Japanese troops in China. Katsutaro, having fallen ill whilst on the trip, met military physician Shinno Ryouichi. The two became a couple and married in 1949. During the wartime, Katsutaro recorded the song "Asu wa Otachika" (明日はお立ちか, You're Leaving Tomorrow?), which became a hit.

After the war ended, Katsutaro moved to Columbia and in 1948 to Teichiku. Her song "Oshima Jowa" became a hit and was used for a movie of the same name. In 1950, she and Hamako Watanabe were invited to America to perform, and also to Brazil with Taro Shoji, where she was received well by Japanese citizens living in Brazil.

In 1961, Katsutaro transferred to Toshiba Records where she recorded mostly hauta and kouta songs. Around the mid 1960s, Katsutaro went back to Victor of Japan to rerecord some of her older hits. By the mid 1960s, so-called "oldies" (older singers and songs) were booming, with many older singers rerecording stereo versions of their hits. A TV program called Natsukashi no Utagoe (Nostalgic Songs), which debuted in 1968, featured Katsutaro as a regular performer until just before her death. In 1971, Katsutaro received a Purple Ribbon award, followed by a second in 1974.

In June 1974, Katsutaro was diagnosed with lung cancer and died on 21 June 1974 at Fuchu Hospital in Tokyo, aged 69. On 25 September 2005, a monument to Katsutaro was established in her birthplace, Niigata.

== Kohaku Uta Gassen performances ==
Throughout her career, Katsutaro performed three times on Kōhaku Uta Gassen, a popular New Year's Eve performance competition television special that has aired annually since 1953.

- 4th Kōhaku Uta Gassen (located at Nihon Gekijo)
  Song performed: "Shima no Musume"
- 6th Kōhaku Uta Gassen (located at Sankei Hall)
  Song performed: "Osome"
- 7th Kōhaku Uta Gassen (located at Tokyo Takarazuka Theater)
  Song performed: "Tojin Okichi no Uta"

== Discography ==
- Shima no Musume (島の娘, "Island Girl"), 1932
- Tokyo Ondo (東京音頭), 1933
- Sakura Ondo, 1934
- Gion Bayashi, 1934
- Manshu Gurashi (満州ぐらし, "Life in Manchu"), 1936
- Kenkoku Sakura (建国さくら, "National Foundation Sakura"), 1940
- Oshima Jowa (大島情話), 1948
