= Nagashima Shigeo Kinen Iwana Baseball Field =

- 長嶋茂雄記念岩名球場
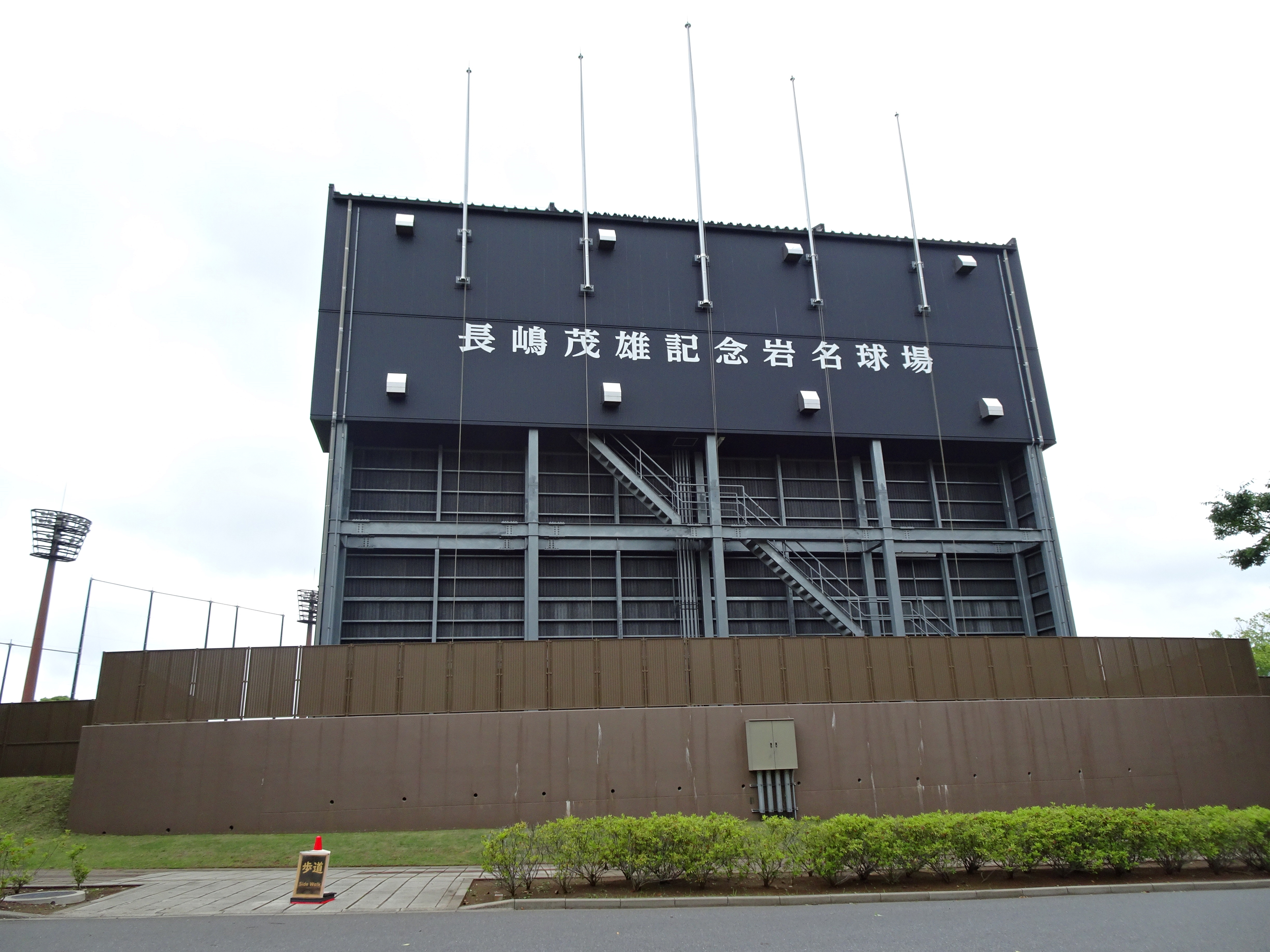
- Interactive map of Nagashima Shigeo Kinen Iwana Baseball Field
- Location: Sakura, Chiba, Japan
- Coordinates: 35°44′26.8″N 140°13′27.5″E
- Owner: Sakura, Chiba
- Capacity: 7,000
- Scoreboard: Electric bulletin board

Construction
- Opened: 1974

Nagashima Shigeo Kinen Iwana Baseball Field (長嶋茂雄記念岩名球場) is a baseball field located in the Iwana Athletic Park.

== Overview ==
When professional baseball player Shigeo Nagashima was awarded the People's Honour Award in 2013, the award ceremony took place at an Iwana baseball field on July 12, 2013. In so doing, Shigeo's achievement in Sakura was celebrated, and the name of the baseball field was renamed to "長嶋茂雄記念岩魚球場."
