= Chiyako Sato =

Chiyako Satō
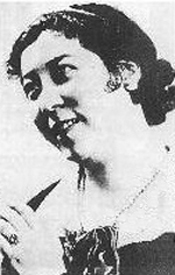

Background information
- Born: Chiyo Sato; 13 March 1897; Tendō, Yamagata Prefecture, Japan
- Died: 13 December 1968 (aged 71) Tokyo, Japan
- Genre: Ryūkōka
- Occupation: Singer
- Years active: 1925–1930

Chiyako Satō (佐藤千夜子 Satō Chiyako) (13 March 1897 – 13 December 1968) was a Japanese ryūkōka singer. She made popular recordings in the 1920s and a world concert tour between 1930 and 1935.

== Biography ==
Satō was born in Tendō, Yamagata in 1897. She attended a mission school in Tokyo and graduated the Tokyo Music School, a precursor to the modern Tokyo University of the Arts.

In the early Shōwa period, Satō, a soprano, achieved success with "Habu no Minato" (波浮の港; 1928; lyrics by Ujō Noguchi, music by Shinpei Nakayama) recorded at Japan Victor Company, and followed this up in 1929 with "Tōkyō Kōshinkyoku" (東京行進曲 or "Tokyo March"; lyrics by Yaso Saijō, music by Nakayama). "Tōkyō Kōshinkyoku" is considered one of the earliest Japanese "pop hits". She also sang songs by composer Masao Koga.

She made a world tour, with stops in Honolulu, San Francisco, Sacramento, Fresno, New York, and Europe, beginning in November 1930. Her concert programs consisted of mostly Japanese folk songs. She explained in 1930, "at present, the Japanese are swinging back to their folk songs, to find in them a deeper satisfaction than they can find in foreign songs." She was described as "a remarkable singer of songs and ballads" in a 1931 publication.

Sato in 1935, on board a ship returning to Japan from her world tour

Satō studied with Leon Cepparo in Los Angeles, made recordings in New York City, and pursued further voice training in Italy during the 1930s. She returned to Japan in 1935, but did not recapture her earlier success. She gave a recital in Tokyo in 1943. She died in 1968, at age 71, in Tokyo.
