= Akiko Futaba =

Japanese singer (1915–2011)

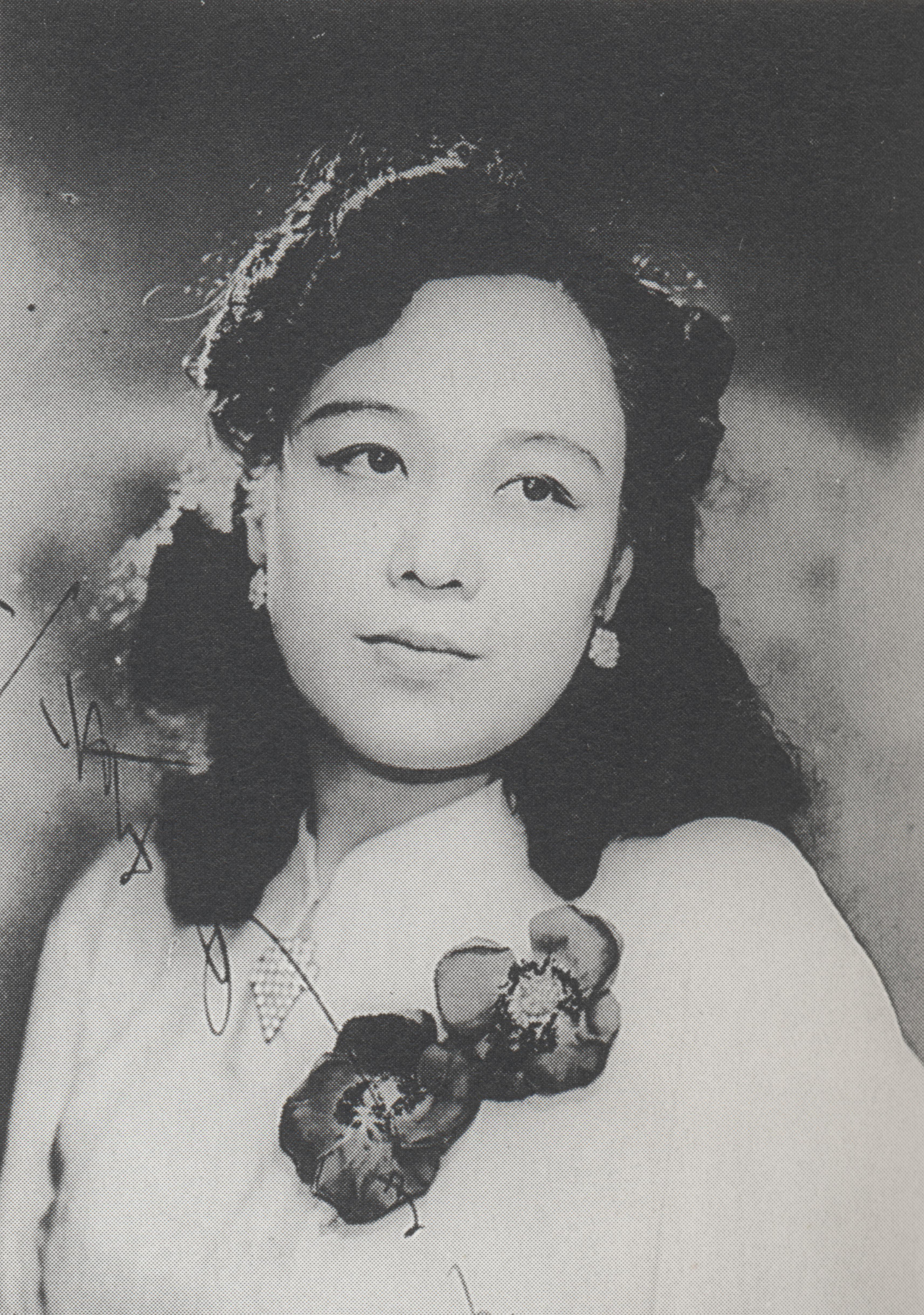
- Akiko Futaba, late 1930s

Background information
- Born: Yoshie Kato; February 2, 1915; Hiroshima, Japan
- Died: August 16, 2011 (aged 96) Hiroshima, Japan
- Genres: Ryūkōka
- Occupation: Singer
- Years active: 1936–2003
- Label: Columbia Music Entertainment

Akiko Futaba (二葉 あき子, Futaba Akiko; born Yoshie Kato (加藤 芳江); February 2, 1915 – August 16, 2011) was a Japanese popular music (ryūkōka) singer. As of the end of World War II, she was one of the most popular female singers in Japan, competing with Hamako Watanabe and Noriko Awaya. In addition, she took part in the Kōhaku Uta Gassen, one of Japan's most famous annual musical television shows, ten times.

== Biography ==
She was born in the city of Hiroshima, and raised in Miyoshi city, Hiroshima Prefecture. She graduated from the Tokyo Music School. Impressed by Takeo Masunaga (also known as Ichiro Fujiyama) at a performance held by the music school, she debuted in 1936. Her famous song "Furuki Hanazono" (古き花園, lit. "Old Flower Garden") was released in 1939. On August 6, 1945, she narrowly avoided the atomic bombing of Hiroshima because she was riding a train traveling through a tunnel at the time of the explosion.

She ceased activity as a singer in 2003, and retired in Hiroshima Prefecture. She died in Hiroshima on August 16, 2011.

== Discography ==
- Ano Yume Kono Yume (あの夢この夢, That Dream, This Dream) : 1936
- Otome Jūku (乙女十九, Girl at the Age of 19) : 1937
- Furuki Hanazono (古き花園, Old Flower Garden) : 1939
- Ano Hana Kono Hana (あの花この花, That Flower, This Flower) : 1940
- Wakarete mo (別れても, Even If We're Apart) : 1946
- Otome Gokoro wa (乙女心は, A Girl's Heart Is) : 1946
- Francesca no Kane (フランチェスカの鐘, The Bells of Francesca) : 1948
- Yume yo Mō Ichido (夢よもういちど, Once Again, Dream) : 1949
- Hoshi no Tameiki (星のためいき, Star's Sigh) : 1950
