= Dick Mine =

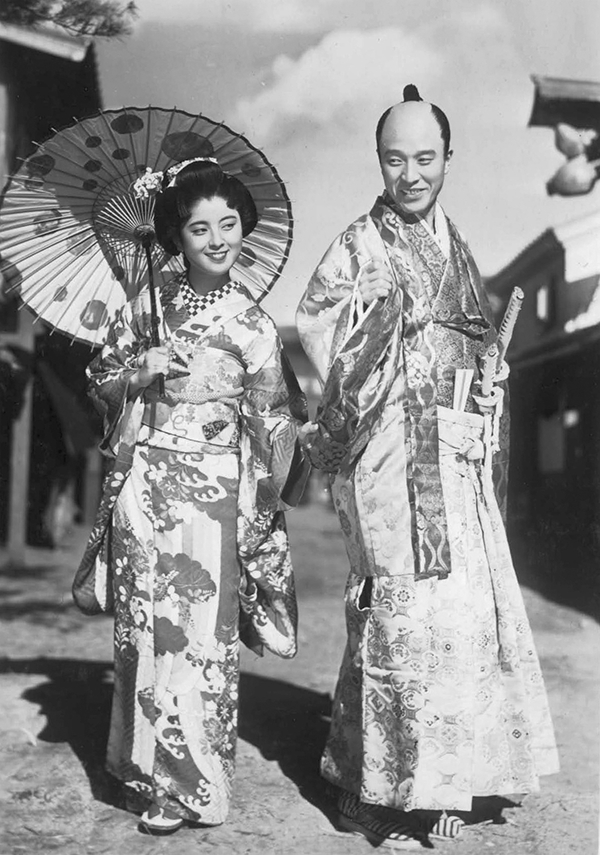
- A still from the 1939 film Singing Lovebirds: Dick Mine (right) with co-star Tomiko Hattori.

Background information
- Also known as: Kōichi Mine
- Born: Tokuichi Mine; October 8, 1908; Tokushima, Tokushima Prefecture, Japan
- Origin: Japan
- Died: June 10, 1991 (aged 82) Fuchu City, Fuchū-shi, Tokyo Metropolis, Japan Tama Cemetery
- Genres: Japanese jazz, Blues, Ryūkōka, Gunka, Kayōkyoku
- Occupation: Singer
- Years active: 1934–1990
- Label: Teichiku Records

Dick Mine (ディック・ミネ, Dikku Mine; Japanese pronunciation: [dikku͍ mine]) October 10, 1908 – June 10, 1991 was a Japanese singer. His recording career spanned nearly the entire Shōwa era.

== Life and career ==
Dick Mine was born Tokuichi Mine (三根 徳一, Mine Tokuichi) on October 8, 1908, in the city of Tokushima. Mine's father, Enjurō Mine, had taught at Tokyo Imperial University and was the first ever principal at Tosa High School; his maternal grandfather had been a priest at the Nikkō Tōshō-gū.

Mine became interested in Western music by listening to his mother's record collection. His interest developed quickly and by his late teens was singing part-time—under the stage name Kōichi Mine—in jazz bands and dance halls while a student at Rikkyo University. He also learned to play the steel guitar, a comparatively rare talent at the time in Japan, which gained him session work for Nippon Columbia backing well-known singers such as Miss Columbia (stage name of Misao Matsubara), among others.

After graduating, a recommendation from his father led to a bank clerk job. The young Mine, however, abandoned the banking profession and was determined to make a career in music.

It was working as a singer and drummer with Noriko Awaya's backing orchestra on the dance hall circuit that Mine began to win fame. He was later approached by Teichiku Records with a record contract, resulting in the beginning of his recorded singing career and the founding of his own band. Together they would come to be known as Dick Mine and his Serenaders (ディック・ミネ・エンド・ヒズ・セレナーダス, Dikku Mine endo hizu serenādasu), though they also would perform as the Teichiku Jazz Orchestra. Among the band's personnel was the California-born Nisei, Betty Inada.

On August 7, 1934, the band cut their first record. That was followed up shortly thereafter with a cover of Dinah, which had been suggested to Mine by Teichiku's house composer, Masao Koga. Their cover—the first record employing Mine's new stage name, Dick Mine—became a smash hit and the song would be identified with Mine for the rest of his life.

In the late 1930s, Mine was signed up by Nikkatsu Studios and played supporting roles in a number of films, including Singing Lovebirds directed by Masahiro Makino.

In 1941, under pressure from anti-Western Japanese censors, Mine reverted to using Kōichi Mine as a stage name. After the Pacific War broke out, Mine divided his career between Japan and Shanghai.

Mine picked up his career after the war, continuing with successes in music and film.

In the 1960s, he became a prominent anti-nuclear activist.

In 1982, he enjoyed his last hit—a duet with Noriko Awaya called Modern Age.

== Death ==
Mine died from heart failure on June 10, 1991. He is buried in the Tama Cemetery in Tokyo.

== Select discography ==
- Dinah (ダイナ) 1934 as Dick Mine and his Serenaders (credited as translator and lyricist under Koichi Mine); 1940 with A. L. King and his Florida Serenaders
- Smiling Irish Eyes (アイルランドの娘, Airurando no musume) (lit. Young Girl of Ireland) 1935
- Those Two Youths (二人は若い, Futari wa wakai) 1935
- Ramona (ラモナ, Ramona) 1936
- La cucaracha (ラ・クカラチャ, Ra kukarachya) 1936
- A Certain Rainy Afternoon... (或る雨の午後, Aru ame no gogo) 1939
- Shanghai Blues (上海ブルース, Shanhai burūsu) 1939
- Asia Blues (亞細亞ブルース, Ajia burūsu) 1939
- Lovebird Singing Contest (鴛鴦歌合戦, Oshidori uta gassen) (lit. Mandarin Duck Song Contest) 1939
- Blue Sky, My Sky (青い空僕の空, Aoisora boku no sora) 1939
- Swing Tokyo (スヰング東京, Suwingu Tōkyō) 1940
- Boulevard of the Autumn Wind (秋風の街, Akikaze no machi) 1941
- Modern Age (モダンエイジ, Modan eiji) (with Noriko Awaya) 1982
