= Shabondama =

Shabondama (シャボン玉; lit. 'Soap Bubbles') is a 1923 Japanese nursery rhyme (warabe uta) composed by Shinpei Nakayama with lyrics written by Ujō Noguchi. It is widely taught in Japanese nursery schools and kindergartens as a simple melody; it is also sometimes used in elementary school moral education courses, where students learn that it is a meditation on the death of a child.

Noguchi's daughter Midori died at the age of just 7 days in 1908. In the Meiji period, the infant mortality rate was quite high, with about 20–30 percent of children dying before reaching schooling age. It was common to have many children to aim for success of the household, but Noguchi was divorced and thus mourned the loss of his only child for a long time.

It is widely believed that Noguchi wrote this poem upon seeing the girls in his village play with bubbles, being reminded of the brief existence of his daughter. However, other than the above facts, the direct inspiration for the song is unknown.

The melody of the song is a modification of the Christian hymn "Jesus Loves Me, This I Know". It is used as the melody for departing trains in Yumoto Station, Iwaki, Fukushima Prefecture.

== Melody and lyrics ==
Japanese

シャボン玉飛んだ
屋根まで飛んだ
屋根まで飛んで
こわれて消えた

シャボン玉消えた
飛ばずに消えた
産まれてすぐに
こわれて消えた

風、風、吹くな
シャボン玉飛ばそ

Literal translation

The soap bubble flew
It flew up to the roof
But reaching the roof,
It broke and was no more.

The soap bubble broke
It broke before flying
So soon after it was born,
It broke and was no more.

Wind, wind, don't you cry
Let my bubble fly.

Translation by John McLean

Little bubbles flew on up
right up to the roofs so high.
Up above the roofs they flew.
Thereupon, they broke and died.

All of them have disappeared,
each and every one of them.
So soon after they were born
all of them have disappeared.

Wind, oh, wind don't blow so hard.
Little bubbles fly, oh, fly.
