= Nitto Records =

Japanese record label

- Country of origin: Japan

A Nitto record label

Nitto Records (ニットーレコード, Nittō rekōdo) was a Japanese record label, originally published by the company Nittō Chikuonki Kabushiki Gaisha (日東蓄音器株式会社) established in Osaka on March 20, 1920. The label was also called the "Swallow Brand", because of their trademark artwork.

Nitto was known as a prolific brand, with over 2,000 titles published in about five years. In 1925, they were recognized as one of the two major labels in Japan at that time.

The label produced numerous records of traditional Japanese music and art such as Jōruri, as well as solo plays of western music and orchestra recordings, although the latter remained small in the share of their overall production. As more record companies with foreign capital entered the market, Nitto gradually lost its competitiveness, and was taken over by Taihei Gramophone Co., Ltd. (太平蓄音器株式会社, Taihei Chikuonki Kabushiki Gaisha) in 1935. After the takeover, Taihei renamed the newly merged company Dainippon Gramophone Co., Ltd. (大日本蓄音器株式会社, Dainippon Chikuonki Kabushiki Gaisha), while maintaining the "Swallow Brand - Nitto Records" along with other labels.

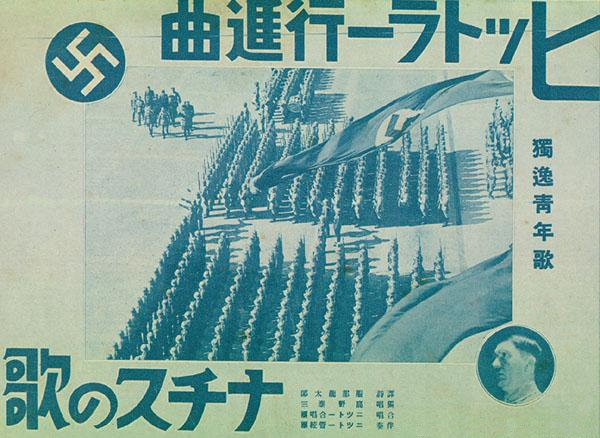
1934 Nitto cover of a Nazi parade song

In one article of a long run series (1997–1999) celebrating the 120th anniversary of phonograph, the Kobe Shimbun wrote: "The only company which could rival Columbia Records head-to-head in the market... (Nitto was) so tightly focused on traditional arts which made them late in responding to rapidly growing demand for popular music. Moreover, it was the retirement of Morishita, who was driving Nitto's marketing strategy all alone, that determined the fate of Nitto."

The Swallow Nitto brand finally disappeared in 1942, when Dainippon Gramophone was absorbed by Kodansha, shareholder of King Records, to become only a production facility of the latter.

Musicians who worked for the label included pop and jazz composer Ryoichi Hattori. Artists signed to the label included Korean soprano Yun Sim-deok.

The British Library Sound Archive holds several Nitto 78 rpm discs of the nagauta genre in its collection.

== See also ==
- List of record labels
- Mercury Records
