= Haruo Oka =

Japanese ryūkōka singer

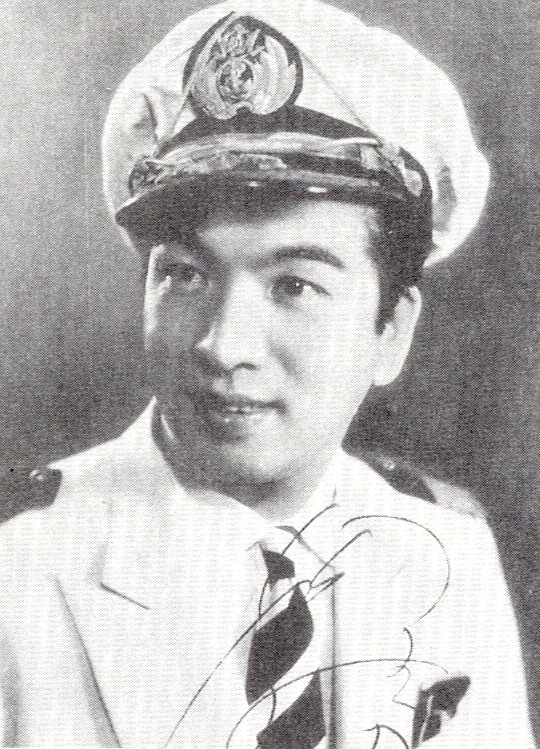

Background information
- Born: Tatsuo Sasaki (佐々木 辰夫; January 12, 1916; Chiba Prefecture, Japan
- Died: May 19, 1970 (aged 54)
- Genres: Ryūkōka
- Occupation: Singer
- Years active: 1939–1970
- Label: King Records

Haruo Oka (岡晴夫, Oka Haruo; January 12, 1916 – May 19, 1970), real name Tatsuo Sasaki (佐々木 辰夫, Sasaki Tatsuo), was a Japanese ryūkōka singer.

He studied music as an enka-shi or a street musician. At that time, he was encouraged by Taro Shoji in Ginza. He signed with King Records in 1938. He debuted with song "Kokkyō no Haru" (国境の春, lit. "Spring at the Border") in 1939. He married Kiyoko Okuda in 1940. In 1944, during the Pacific War, he was dispatched to Ambon Island, but soon returned due to sickness.

After the war, his popularity grew, and he starred in Akogare no Hawaii kōro with Hibari Misora. However, he never performed at the Kohaku Uta Gassen partly because he attached importance to live performances.

== Discography ==
- Kokkyo no Haru (国境の春, Spring at the Border) : 1939
- Shanhai no Hanauri Musume (上海の花売娘, Shanghai Flower Girl) : 1939
- Kanton no Hanauri Musume (広東の花売娘, Guangdong Flower Girl) : 1940
- Nankin no Hanauri Musume (南京の花売娘, Nanjing Flower Girl) : 1940
- Parao Koishiya (パラオ恋しや, Love Palau) : 1940
- New Tokyo Song (ニュー・トーキョー・ソング) : 1946
- Tokyo no Hanauri Musume (東京の花売娘, Tokyo Flower Girl) : 1946
- Nakuna Kotoriyo (啼くな小鳩よ, Don't Cry, Small Bird) : 1947
- Akogare no Hawaii kōro (憧れのハワイ航路) : 1948
- Aitakattaze (逢いたかったぜ, I Wanted To Meet You) : 1955
