= Bin Uehara =

Bin Uehara 上原 敏
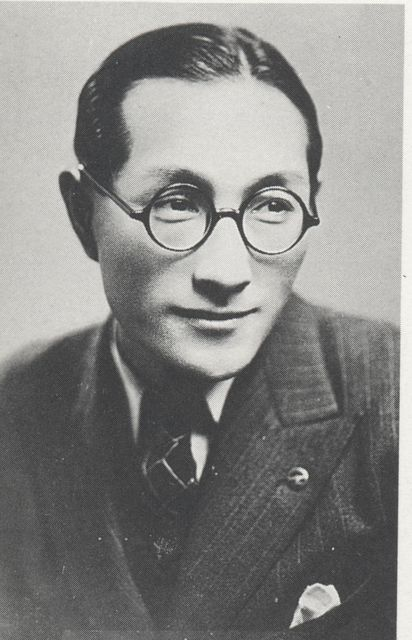

Background information
- Born: Rikiji Matsumoto; August 26, 1908; Akita Prefecture, Japan
- Died: July 29, 1944 (aged 35) New Guinea
- Genre: Ryūkōka
- Occupation: Singer
- Years active: 1936–1943

Bin Uehara (上原 敏, Uehara Bin; August 26, 1908 – July 29, 1944) was a Japanese music (ryūkōka) singer and soldier. He was known for using naniwa-bushi's kobushi vocalism in Japanese popular music. He was killed in action during the eastern New Guinea campaign during the Pacific War.

== Life ==
Uehara was born as Rikiji Matsumoto in Ōdate, Akita Prefecture, Japan. He graduated from Senshu University, and made his professional debut with the song "Tsukimi Odori" (月見踊り, lit. "Moon-viewing Dance") under the Japanese division of Polydor Records in 1936. His famous songs included the 1937 song "Ruten" (流転, lit. "Stream-rolling"). His vocal style, called kobushi, became popular as the more emphatic form among modern enka singers.

Uehara became a soldier in 1943, went to New Guinea, and was killed in battle on July 29, 1944.

== Legacy ==
In 1976, a monument honoring him was established in his home city of Ōdate.

== Discography ==
- Tsumagoi dōchū (妻恋道中, In the Way of Wife-love) : 1937
- Ruten (流転, Vicissitudes) : 1937
- Ryūsa no mamori (流砂の護り, Guardians of the Flowing Sand) : 1937
- Shanghai dayori (上海だより, Shanghai Letter) : 1938
- Iroha jingi (いろは仁義, Iroha Benevolence And Righteousness) : 1938
- Nankin dayori (南京だより, Nanjing Letter) : 1938
- Hokuman dayori (北満だより, North Manchu Letter) : 1938
- Butaichō to heitai (部隊長と兵隊, Unit Commander and Soldier) : 1938 with Taro Shoji
- Ore wa funanori (俺は船乗り, I am a Sailor) : 1939
- Otoko funanori (男船乗り, Male Sailor) : 1939
- Butsuin dayori (佛印だより, French Indochina Letter) : 1941
