= Ryūkōka =

Music genre

- Stylistic origins: Traditional pop; Western classical music; operetta; vocal music; Dodoitsu; min'yō; jazz; blues; tango
- Cultural origins: 1920s, Japan
- Derivative forms: Enka; kayōkyoku; trot

Ryūkōka (流行歌; lit. 'popular song') is a Japanese musical genre. The term originally denoted any kind of "popular music" in Japanese, and is the sinic reading of hayariuta, used for commercial music of Edo Period. Therefore, imayō, which was promoted by Emperor Go-Shirakawa in the Heian period, was a kind of ryūkōka. Today, however, ryūkōka refers specifically to Japanese popular music from the late 1920s through the early 1960s. Some of the roots of ryūkōka were developed from Western classical music. Ryūkōka ultimately split into two genres: enka and poppusu. Unlike enka, archetypal ryūkōka songs did not use the kobushi method of singing. Ryūkōka used legato. Bin Uehara and Yoshio Tabata are considered to be among the founders of the modern style of kobushi singing.

Many composers and singers of ryūkōka went on to earn official distinctions; Ichiro Fujiyama and composers Masao Koga and Ryoichi Hattori received the People's Honour Award in later years.

Although enka branched off from ryūkōka, many singers of the latter genre proclaimed strong disdain for its stylistic descendant. In a 1981 interview, Noriko Awaya said "Whenever I hear enka, I have to get away from the music because I feel like vomiting." (Note: Original text: "演歌を聴くと胸がムカムカするから、あれが聴こえてくると逃げ回るんです。")

== History ==
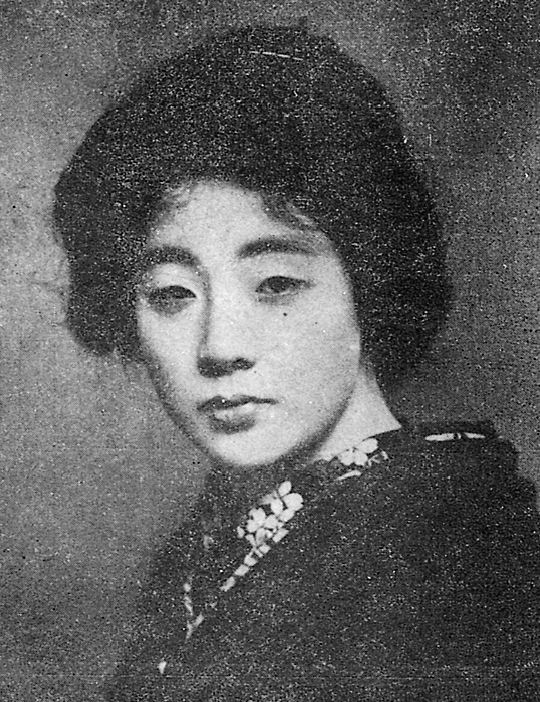
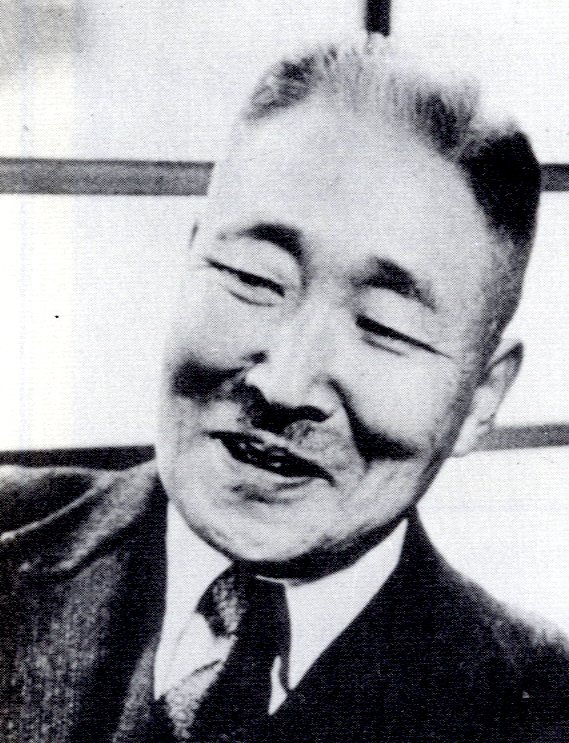
Singer Sumako Matsui and composer Shinpei Nakayama

=== 1914–1927: Origin ===
In 1914, Sumako Matsui's song "Katyusha's song", composed by Shinpei Nakayama, was used as a theme of the rendition Resurrection in Japan. The record of the song sold 20,000 copies. One theory holds that this was the first ryūkōka song, which was made by Hogetsu Shimamura's order: "the tune between Japanese popular folk music and Western music". (Note: Original text: "日本の俗謡と西洋歌曲の中間のような旋律") However, street performers called "enka-shi" (演歌師) had been popular until record labels such as the Victor Company of Japan began to produce songs in the early Shōwa period.

Although Matsui committed suicide after Shimamura's death, Nakayama continued to develop his music. During his career, he composed about 3,000 songs such as the 1921 song "Teru teru bozu". Nakayama transferred Japanese traditional music to staff-style by main force. His 1921 song "Sendō Kouta" (船頭小唄) was later covered by various singers, but was at first best known for being covered by violin enka-shi Shunyo Tottori (鳥取春陽, Tottori Shun'yō; 1900–1932) featuring Orchestra. The pentatonic scale used in this song was "Minor scale without forth and seventh degree". However, the music based on the scale had difficulty in presenting chord and harmony because traditional Japanese music didn't adopt equal temperament.

Nakayama's songs were based on Japanese folk music called min'yō, but also adopted Western musical style. Therefore, his music was called "Shin Min'yō" (新民謡, lit. "New Folk Song").

=== 1928–1930: Beginning of popularity ===
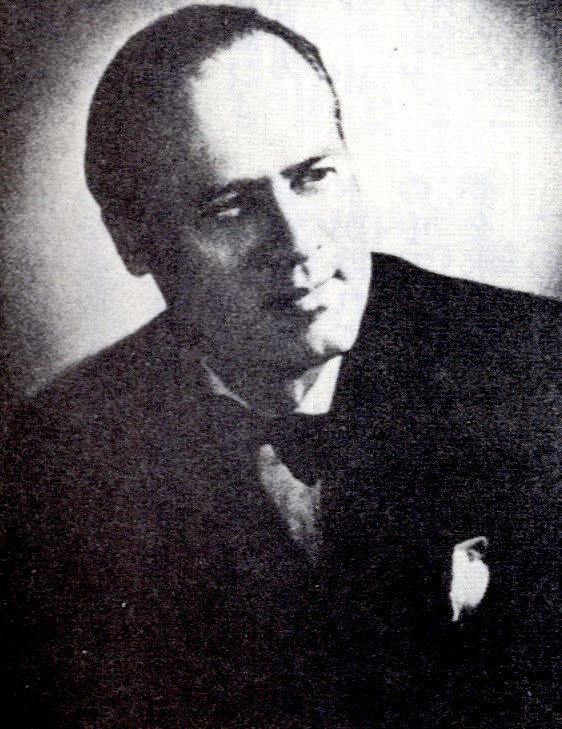
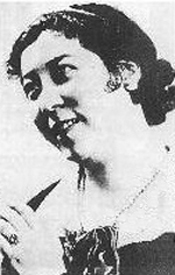
Yoshie Fujiwara and Chiyako Sato

In the early Showa period, the microphone was introduced into the popular music of Japan. Teiichi Futamura released his cover version of "Sing Me a Song of Arabia" (アラビヤの唄, Arabiya no Uta) in 1928. The song was originally composed by Fred Fisher. Chiyako Sato's 1928 song "Habu no Minato" (波浮の港, lit. "Port of Habu") (Note: Habu is a port in Izu Ōshima.), composed by Nakayama, sold 100,000 copies. The song was also sung by singer Yoshie Fujiwara. Chiyako Sato's 1929 song "Tokyo March" sold more than 300,000 copies.

=== 1931–1937: Rising popularity ===
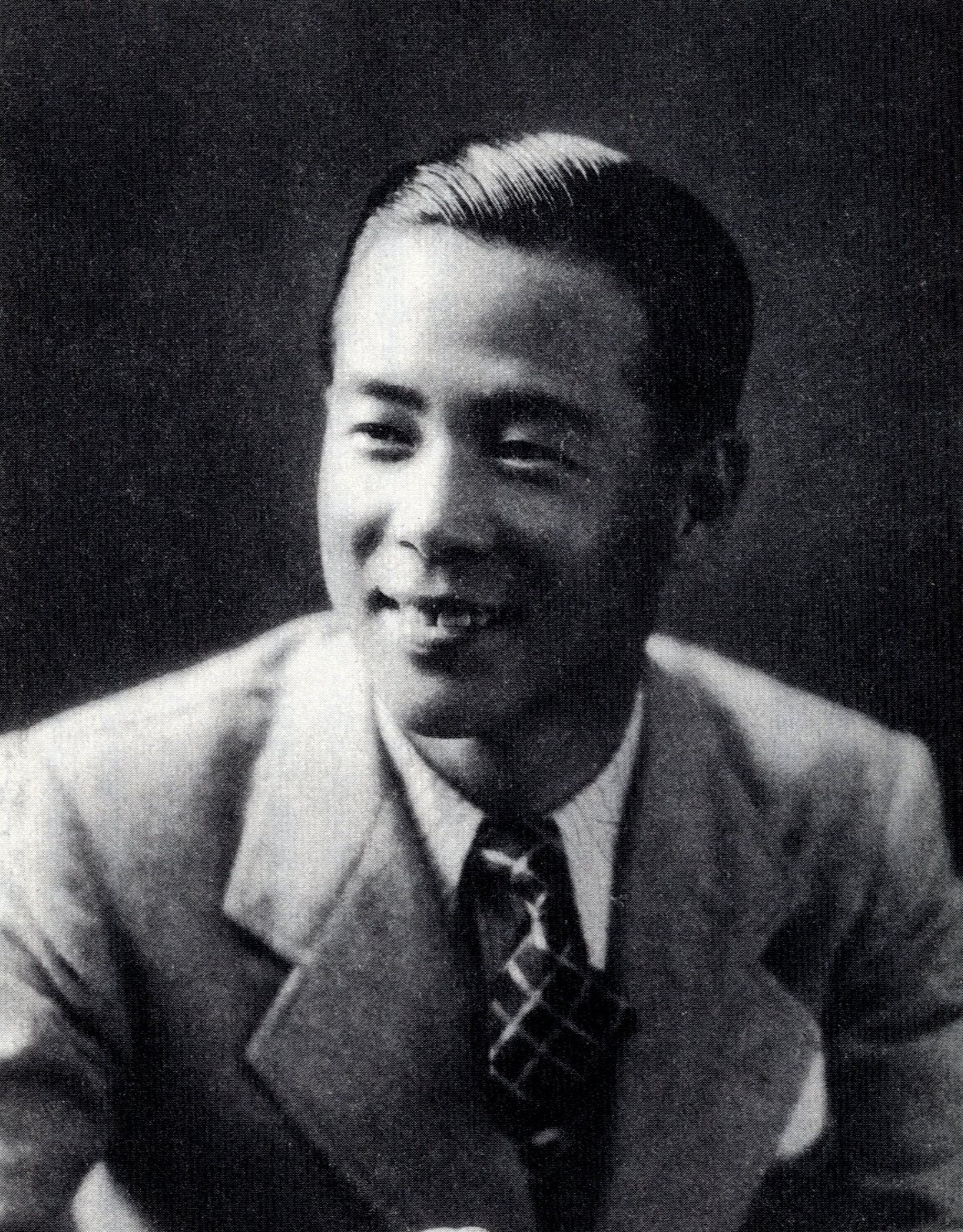
People's Honour Award winning singer Ichiro Fujiyama

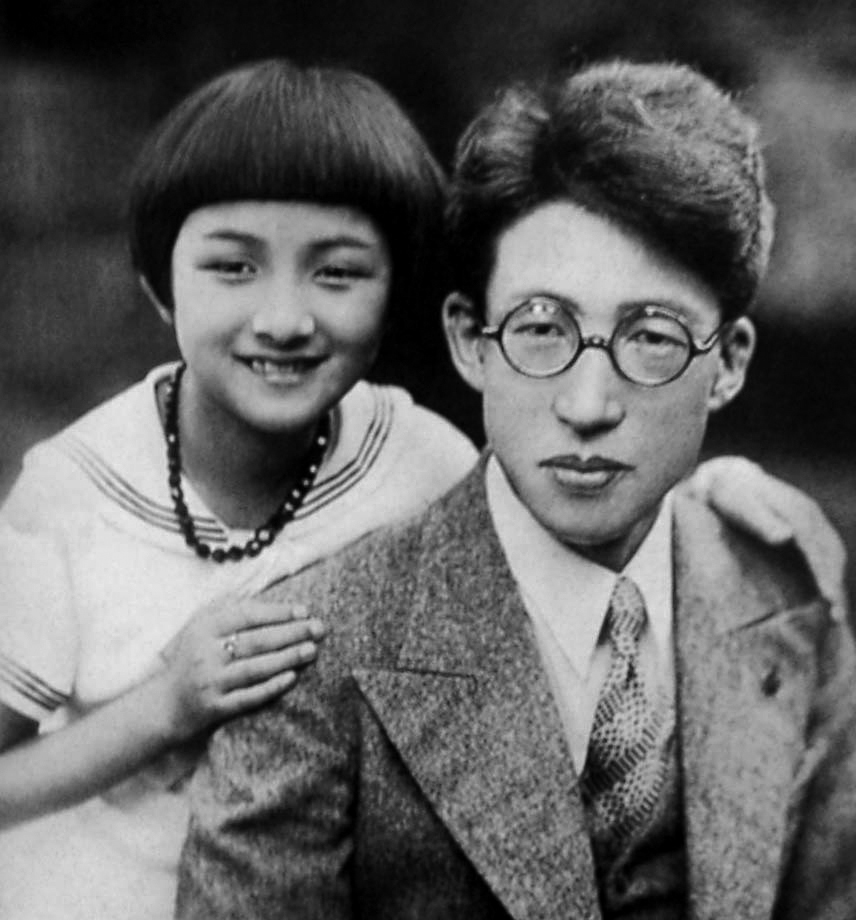
Hideko Takamine and Taro Shoji

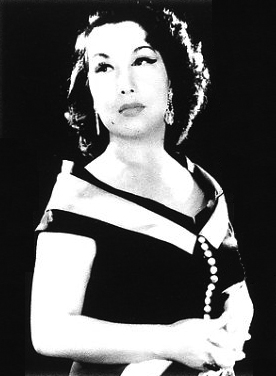
Noriko Awaya, the "Queen of Blues" in Japan

Some of the country's first major stars were singer Ichiro Fujiyama and composer Masao Koga. Koga attempted to initiate fusion of Western jazz and Japanese dodoitsu. Fujiyama's 1931 song "Sake wa Namida ka Tameiki ka" (酒は涙か溜息か, lit. "Is Sake Tears or Sighs?"), composed by Koga, became a major hit in Japan. This song created a fusion of Fujiyama's crooning and Koga's guitar play. Using the vocal technic Mezza Voce with a microphone, Fujiyama sang the song by the deep voice of not Opera's G minor but D minor. Fujiyama's song "Oka o Koete" (丘を越えて, lit. "Beyond the Hill") sold 600,000 copies. However, Fujiyama was an elite student, who specialized Western classical music in the Tokyo Music School. Ryūkōka songs often dealt with the "Ero Guro Nansensu" things. Since his school regarded ryūkōka as bad form at that time, Fujiyama was once suspended from the school, though Fujiyama was not dismissed from the school because Klaus Pringsheim Sr., a professor of the school, opposed the proposal of Fujiyama's expulsion.

This period also saw the popularity of geisha singers such as Ichimaru and Katsutaro Kouta. Katsutaro became famous when Fujiyama was turned out of ryūkōka. Her song "Shima no Musume" (島の娘, lit. "Island Girl") sold 600,000 copies. Katsutaro and Issei Mishima recorded duet song "Tokyo Ondo". The song was composed by Shinpei Nakayama and was released in 1933. The single "Tokyo Ondo" sold 1,200,000 copies.

When Fujiyama sang Western classic lied songs, those songs were called "kayōkyoku", but the term "kayōkyoku" went on to be used as another name of ryūkōka in NHK. At first, Koga was a good co-worker for Fujiyama but they moved apart from each other because Koga sought "Japanese" music. On the other hand, Yoshie Fujiwara drew a clear line between him and ryūkōka and established the Fujiwara Opera in 1934, launching the establishment of Japanese Opera. Baritone singer Taro Shoji's 1934 song "Akagi no Komoriuta" (赤城の子守唄, lit. "Lullaby of Akagi") also became popular, though he did not know Kunisada Chūji, the theme of the song.

Soprano singer Noriko Awaya also sang ryūkōka, but the Toyo Music School once annulled her graduation. However, her song "Wakare no Blues" (別れのブルース, lit. "Farewell Blues") became a hit in 1937. The song was composed by jazz composer Ryoichi Hattori. She was called "Queen of Blues", though term "blues" was just a song title.

=== 1937–1945: Influences of war ===
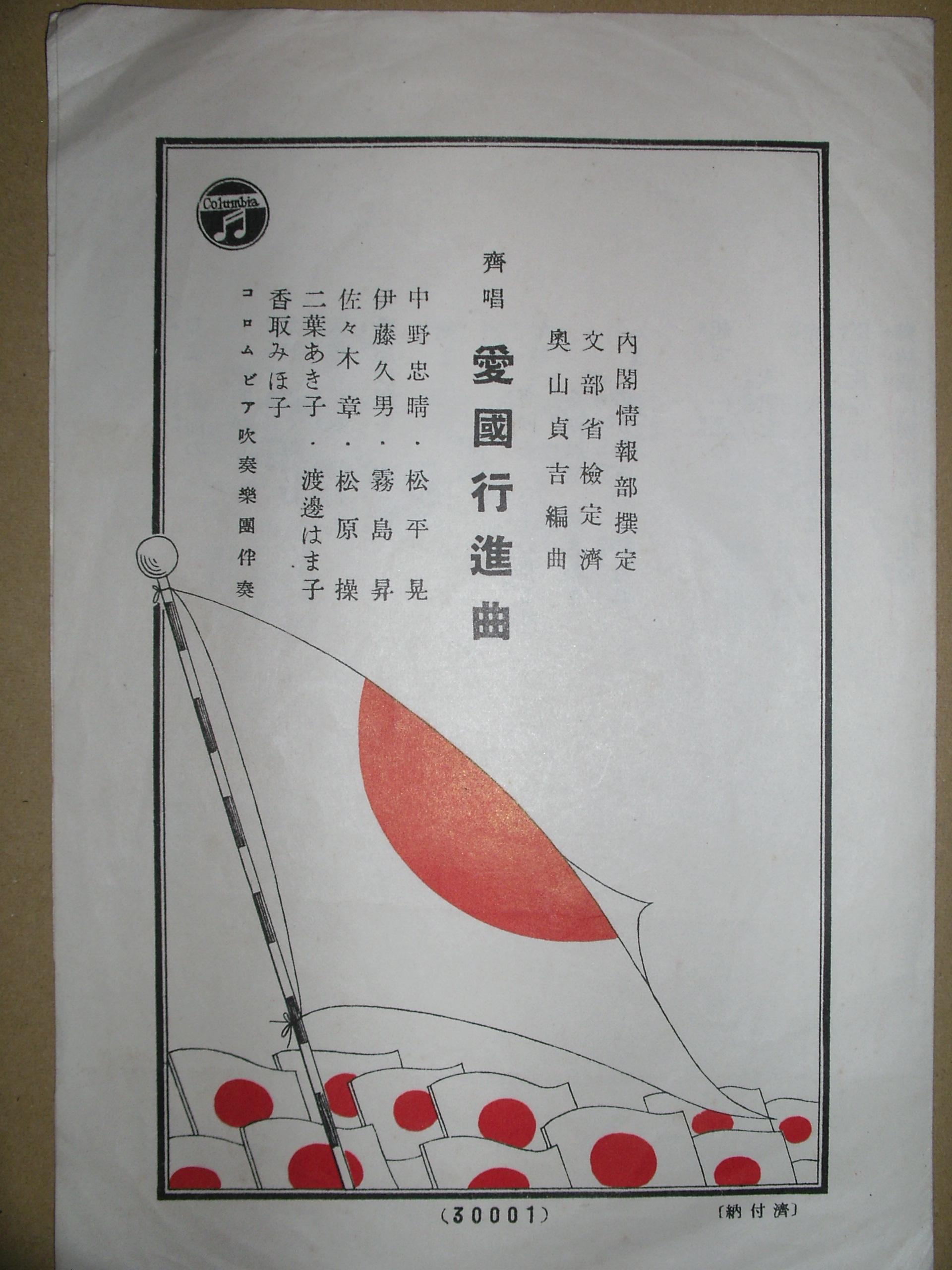
The lyric sheet of "Patriotic March"

In 1936, NHK started radio program "Kokumin Kayō" (国民歌謡, lit. "National Kayō") to compete with ryūkōka, which was under the influence of "Ero Guro Nansensu", but it soon began to air war songs around July 1937. The program was renamed to "Warera no Uta" (われらのうた, lit. "Our Songs") in 1941 and then "Kokumin Gasshō" (国民合唱, lit. "National Group Singing") in 1942. The songs during the war were called "Senji Kayō" (戦時歌謡). During the war, many musicians were forced to write war songs. Yuji Koseki composed many war songs and was later criticised as a war collaborator, though he seemed to be touched with remorse. Koseki composed "Roei no Uta" (露営の歌, lit. "Song of the Camp") released in 1937. Although the song was a B-side song, it sold 600,000 copies. The 1937 song "Aikoku Kōshinkyoku" (愛国行進曲, lit. "Patriotic March") sold 1,000,000 copies. However, Japanese jazz musicians such as Ryoichi Hattori seemed to be vigorless to compose war songs. His son Katsuhisa Hattori claimed that he was not an antinationalist and he technically were hardly not able to compose war songs even if they wanted to make those because Japanese war songs were musically enka.

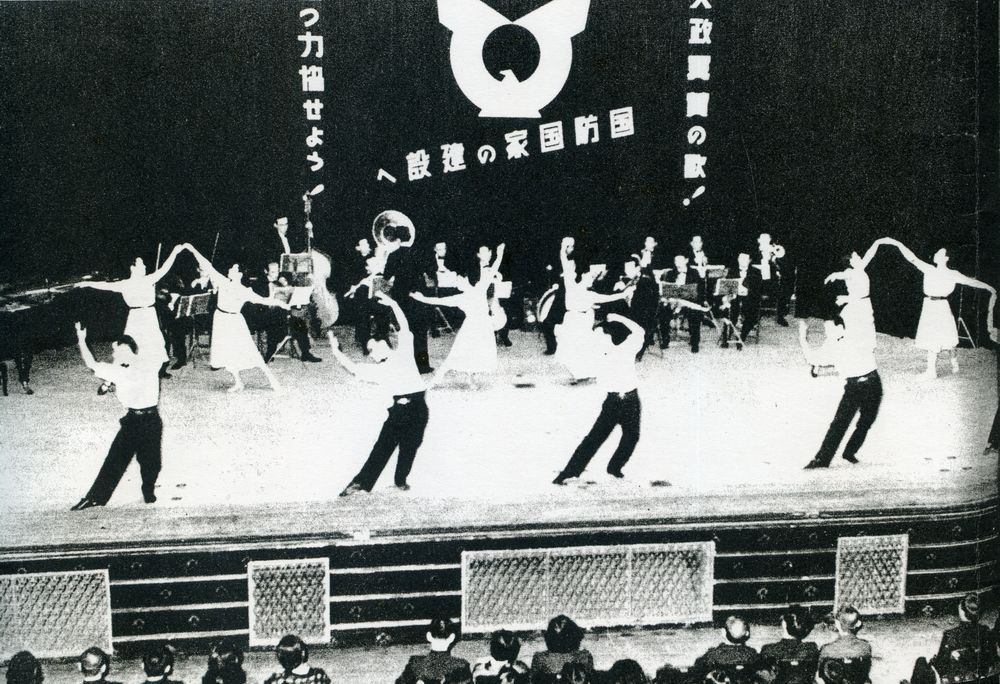
Recital of "The Song of Taisei Yokusan" in 1940

On the other hand, former enka-shi Haruo Oka's debut song "Kokkyō no Haru" (国境の春, lit. "Spring at the Border") was released in 1939. Yoshio Tabata also mede his debut with song "Shima no Funauta" (島の舟唄, lit. "Island Ship Song") in 1939. Rōkyoku (naniwa-bushi) was used for enhancing the national prestige.

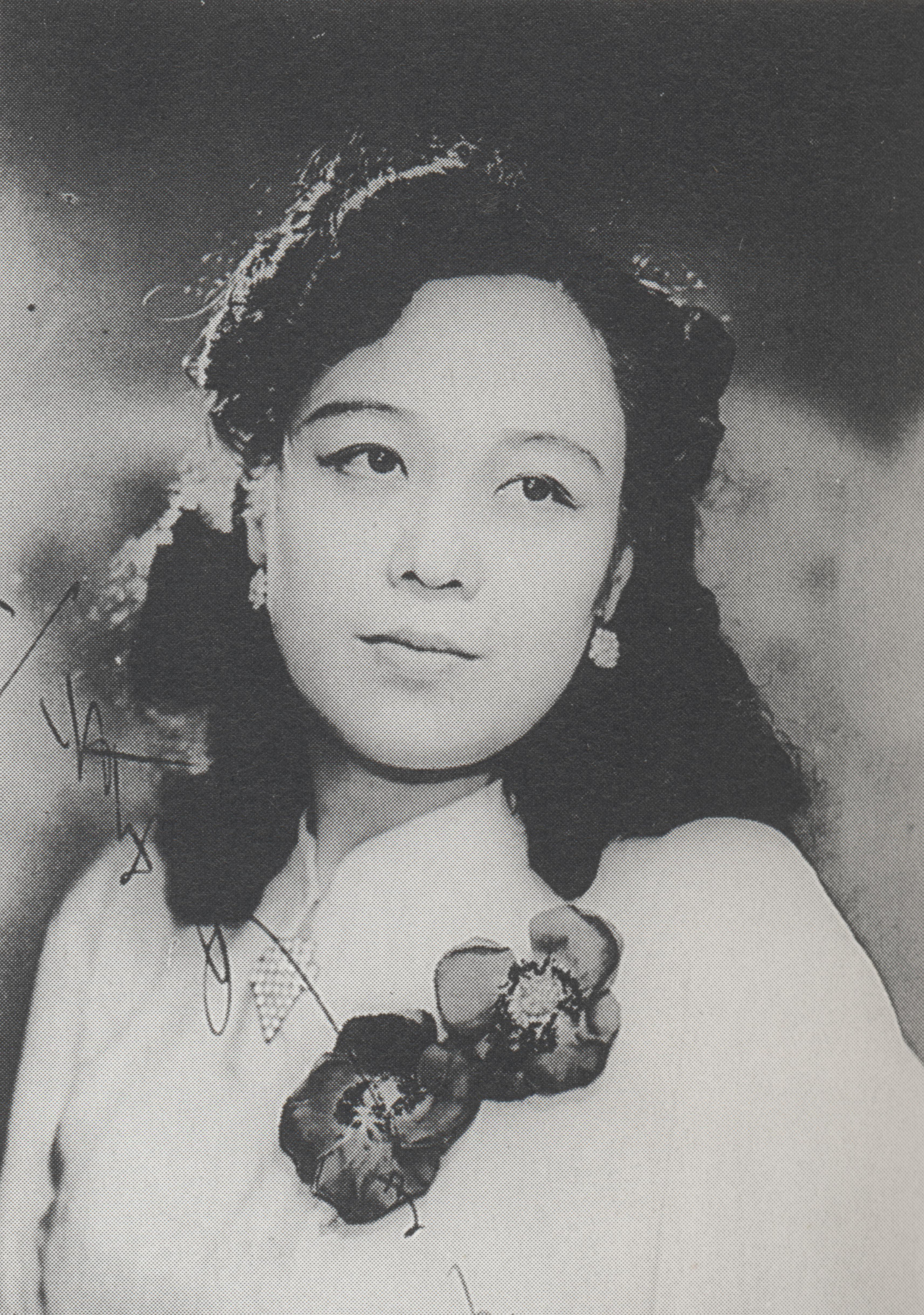
Akiko Futaba, who sang "Kōgen no Tsuki"

Although many war songs were made after the beginning of the Pacific War, "Kōgen no Tsuki" (高原の月, lit. "Tableland Moon"), sung by Noboru Kirishima and Akiko Futaba, became popular as a lyrical song. When the war was nearing an end, the theme included frightful spectacles such as the Battle of Attu, Guadalcanal campaign and Marshall Islands Campaign. Oka went to Ambon Island, but fell ill and soon returned to Japan. Bin Uehara, who used kobushi of naniwa-bushi for singing, was killed in the New Guinea campaign and Fujiyama was taken prisoner in Indonesia.

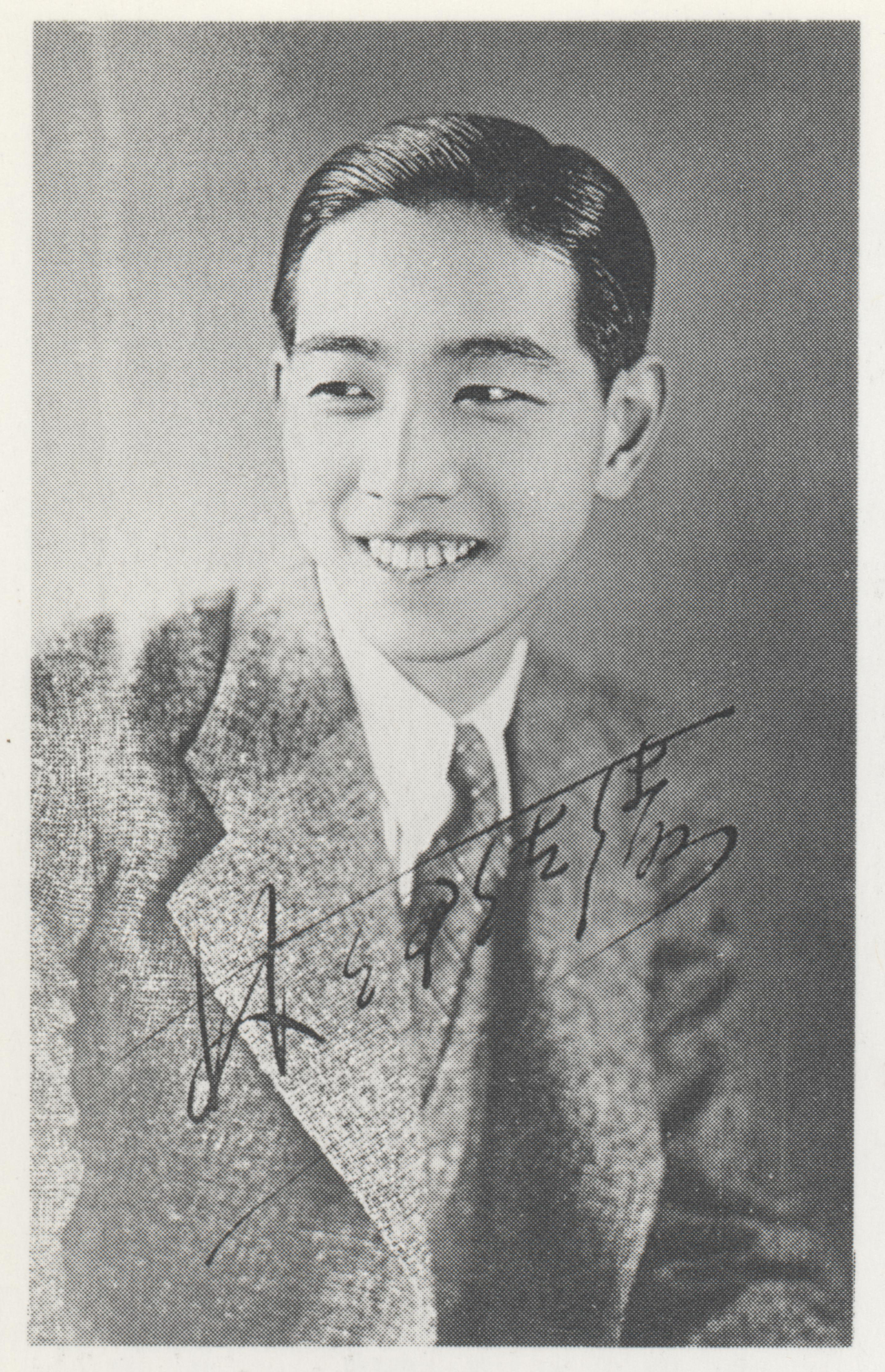
Isao Hayashi, the composer for military song "Shussei Heishi o Okuru Uta"

After the war, the songs during the war have been regarded as a taboo even in Japan despite those historical importance. One of war songs, "Shussei Heishi o Okuru Uta" (出征兵士を送る歌, literally "Song for giving warriors a send-off"), composed by Isao Hayashi, went on to become a theme of Japanese right-wing groups called uyoku dantai. Li Xianglan's "Suzhou Nocturne", composed by Hattori, has remained controversial in China, though it was a non-propaganda song. After the war, Taro Shoji, who heard the Gyokuon-hōsō in Nagano Prefecture, was once banned from singing many of his songs because those were regarded as nationalistic. Rōkyoku faded into the wallpaper with the spread of television in the postwar period. In 1946, NHK revived their music program as "Radio Kayō" and it was later reformed as "Minna no Uta", but NHK was disinclined to mention its former history.

=== 1945–1954: Postwar popularity ===
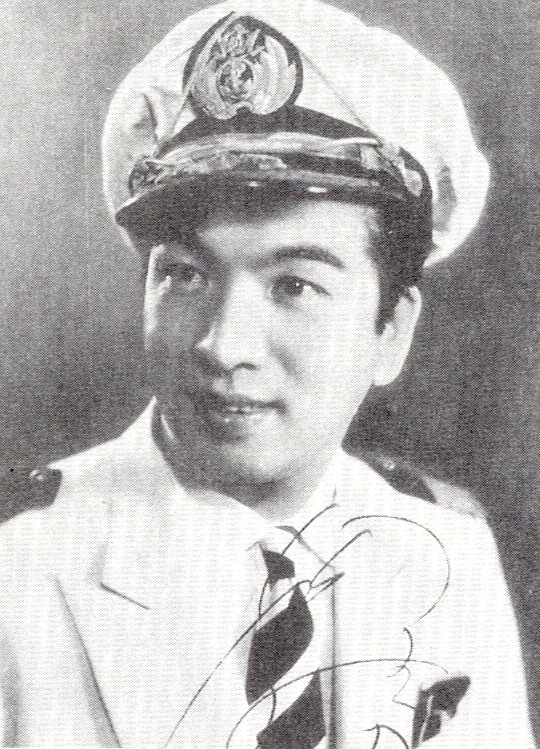
Haruo Oka, who sang "Akogare no Hawaii kōro"

Michiko Namiki's song "Ringo no Uta" (リンゴの唄, lit. "Song of Apple") sung by Michiko Namiki and Noboru Kirishima, airing in 1945 movie "Soyokaze", became popular. Haruo Oka also released hit songs such as his 1946 song "Tokyo no Hanauri Musume" (東京の花売り娘, lit. "Tokyo Flower Girl") and his 1948 song "Akogare no Hawaii kōro" (憧れのハワイ航路, lit. "Coveted Fairway to Hawaii"). Ichiro Fujiyama, who was falsely reported to have been killed in battle, returned to Japan in 1946.

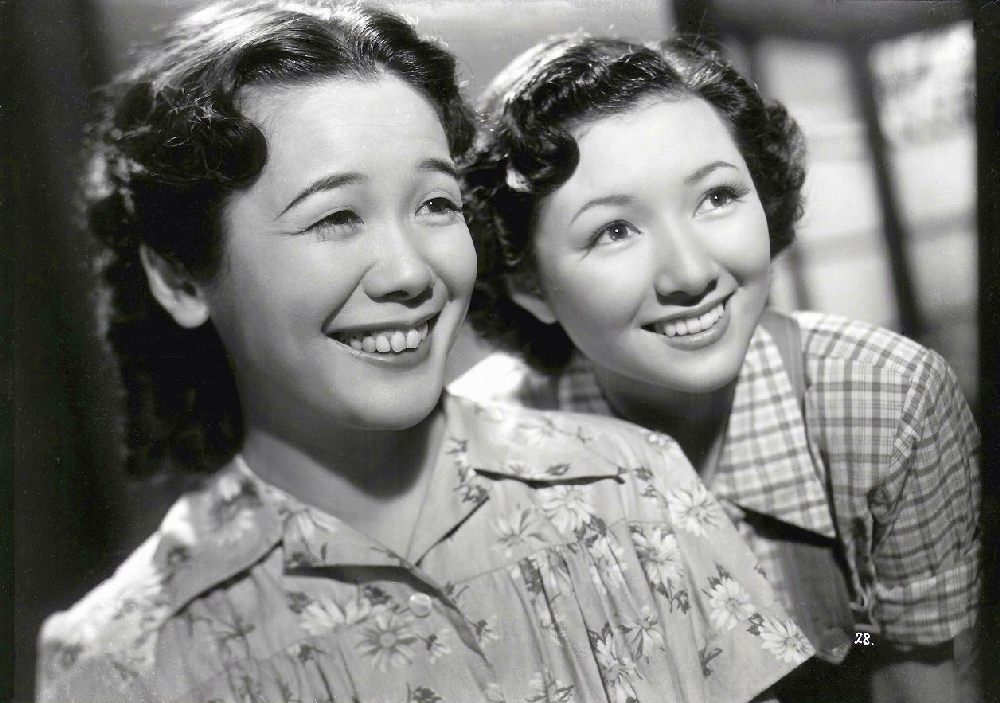
Jazz singer Shizuko Kasagi and actress Hideko Takamine

Ryoichi Hattori, who moved to Shanghai in 1944, contributed to advancing Japanese poppusu music after the war. Shizuko Kasagi's 1947 song "Tokyo Boogie-Woogie", composed by Hattori, became popular. Hattori also composed Ichimaru's 1949 song "Shamisen Boogie-Woogie". Around that time, Hibari Misora became known as an impersonator of Kasagi. She made her debut with song "Kappa Boogie-Woogie" in 1949. Hattori's composed song "Aoi Sanmyaku" (青い山脈, lit. "Blue Mountains"), which was sung by Ichiro Fujiyama and Mitsue Nara, became a major hit in the early post-war years in Japan.

Yuji Koseki composed "Nagasaki no Kane" (長崎の鐘, lit. "The Bells of Nagasaki") and "Himeyuri no Tō" (ひめゆりの塔, lit. "Himeyuri Lily Tower"). "Nagasaki no Kane", based on Takashi Nagai's book The Bells of Nagasaki, was sung by Fujiyama in 1949. Fujiyama became the final singer of all singers at the 1st Kōhaku Uta Gassen with "Nagasaki no Kane" in 1951. Chiemi Eri debuted in 1952 and Izumi Yukimura debuted in 1953. Fujiyama moved to NHK in 1954 and returned to his original style―classical music. He went on to become a conductor for "Hotaru no Hikari" at the Kōhaku Uta Gassen.

=== 1955–1963: Transformation of music ===
New singers such as Hibari Misora, Hachiro Kasuga, Michiya Mihashi and Chiyoko Shimakura became popular when old singers became unpopular. The period between around 1955 and 1964 saw the popularity of "kayōkyoku". Around that time, Japanese composers went on to establish their own genres such as Toru Funamura and Minoru Endo's "Enka", Tadashi Yoshida's "Mood Kayō", and Hachidai Nakamura and Hiroshi Miyagawa's "Jazz". Masao Koga renounced his pre-war musical style, approaching Hibari Misora.

The song "Otomisan" was made for being sung by Haruo Oka, but was eventually sung by Hachiro Kasuga and became a major hit in Japan in 1954. The single sold over one million copies. The song was composed by Masanobu Tokuchi, who came from the Ryukyu Islands. Kasuga's 1955 song "Wakare no Ipponsugi", composed by Funamura, also became a hit song. Funamura also composed Michiya Mihashi's 1955 song "Anoko Ga Naiteru Hatoba". Ryōkyōku singers such as Haruo Minami and Hideo Murata joined Japanese popular music. Hachiro Kasuga, Michiya Mihashi and Hideo Murata went on to form their genre later called enka.

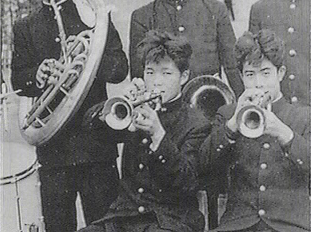
Kyu Sakamoto and his school band

Frank Nagai's 1957 song "Yūrakuchō de Aimashō", composed by Yoshida, also became popular. Around that time, however, Japanese rock and roll movement began and the Nichigeki Western Carnival was opened in 1958. The concerts were taken part in by future popular singers such as Mickey Curtis and Kyu Sakamoto. Against Japanese rock and roll movement, Yukio Hashi shocked Japanese popular music as a young enka singer because singers of the genre were elderly singers such as Hachiro Kasuga and Michiya Mihashi.

Japanese singers such as Kyu Sakamoto, The Peanuts and Mieko Hirota covered American songs at first, but they began to sing their own song. Sakamoto's 1961 single "Ue o muite arukō", composed by Nakamura, became a major hit in Japan. On the other hand, Hideo Murata's 1961 single "Ōsho" (王将, lit. "King General"), composed by Toru Funamura, sold over one million copies in Japan. On June 5, 1962, Saburō Kitajima made his debut with the single "Bungacha Bushi." Funamura composed Kitajima's 1962 hit song "Namida Bune" (なみだ船, lit. "Boat of Tears"). Hiroshi Miyagawa composed The Peanuts' 1962 song "Furimukanaide." The Peanuts also sang "Mothra's Song". The song was composed by Yuji Koseki.

In 1963, the era of former popular singers such as Hibari Misora, Chiemi Eri, Izumi Yukimura, Hachiro Kasuga, Michiya Mihashi and Frank Nagai seemed to end and Sakamoto released a Japanese hit song titled "Miagete Goran Yoru no Hoshi o". In June 1963, Sakamoto's "Ue o muite arukō" reached the number-one position in the U.S. Billboard Hot 100 under its alternative title "Sukiyaki". In 1963, Kitajima's song "Guitar Jingi" (ギター仁義, lit. "Guitar Benevolence and Righteousness") and Kazuo Funaki's song "Koko San Nen Sei" (高校三年生, lit. "High School Seniors") also became popular. Both songs were composed by Minoru Endo. Hashi and Funaki became singers for youth music, making a new genre called "Seishun Kayō" (青春歌謡, lit. "Youthful Kayō").

=== 1963–1966: Enka's independence and collapse ===
On September 6, 1963, record label Nippon Crown became independent from the Nippon Columbia. Saburō Kitajima was its member. Hibari Misora presented a song titled "Kanto Harusame Kasa" when the record label was established. Kitajima took part in the Kōhaku Uta Gassen for the first time on December 31, 1963. The audience share of the 14th Kōhaku Uta Gassen reached 81.4% in 1963. In 1964, Haruo Minami released his cover version of song "Tokyo Gorin Ondo" (東京五輪音頭, lit. "Ondo for the Tokyo Olympics"), composed by Masao Koga. In 1965, Kitajima released a string of hits such as "Kyōdai Jingi" (兄弟仁義, lit. "Brother Benevolence And Righteousness"), "Kaerokana" (帰ろかな, lit. "Maybe I Will Return to My Home") and "Hakodate no Hito" (函館の女, lit. "Hakodate Woman"). "Kaerokana" was composed by Hachidai Nakamura. Koga composed Hibari's song "Yawara", which won the grand prix award at the Japan Record Award in 1965. Koga was also an original composer of Hibari's 1966 cover song "Kanashii Sake" (悲しい酒, lit. "Sad Sake"). His music, called "Koga melody", became a base of modern enka and he became known as "the father of modern enka".

On the other hand, Hachidai Nakamura also composed the Johnnys' 1964 debut single "Wakai Namida." Japanese guitarist Yūzō Kayama also produced his 1965 hit song "Kimi to Itsumademo" as a singer. British rock band The Beatles visited Japan and had a concert at the Nippon Budokan in 1966. With the aim of breaking the traditional style, Group Sounds band The Blue Comets' 1966 song "Aoi Hitomi" (青い瞳, lit. "Blue Eye"), originally released as an English song, was released as a Japanese song. In 1966, folk singer Ryoko Moriyama, a daughter of jazz musician Hisashi Moriyama, also released hit song "Kyō no Hi wa Sayōnara" (今日の日はさようなら, lit. "Good-bye, Today"). The Blue Comets' song "Blue Chateau" won the grand prix award at the Japan Record Award in 1967. The Folk Crusaders' 1967 song "I Only Live Twice" also had a big impact on Japanese popular music. New musical movement called "Kayō Pops" (歌謡ポップス) also a string of hits such as Ayumi Ishida's 1968 song "Blue Light Yokohama", composed by Kyohei Tsutsumi.

Group Sounds became unpopular in the late 1960s in Japan. Then, Group Sounds was displaced by "New Rock" in Japanese underground rock music around 1970. Japanese-language rock band Happy End became one of prototypes of modern J-pop. Mickey Curtis formed rock band "Samurai" in 1969 in U.K. and later scouted the Japanese band "Carol" in which leader was Eikichi Yazawa.

== Legacy ==
A part of Ryoichi Hattori's Western-style music during that period remained in Western-style classical music of Japan and was transvalued in 2000s. His tribute album was released on October 17, 2007. Various musicians such as Hideaki Tokunaga (for "Wakare no Blues"), Kazumasa Oda (for "Suzhou Nocturne"), Masaharu Fukuyama (for "Tokyo Boogie-woogie") and Tokyo Ska Paradise Orchestra (for "Aoi Sanmyaku") took part in the album. The tribute album debuted at the number-ten position on the Japanese Oricon weekly album charts.

== See also ==
- J-pop
- Enka
- Trot
- Taiwanese pop
