= Ichirō Fujiyama =

Japanese singer and composer (1911–1993)

Ichirō Fujiyama 藤山一郎
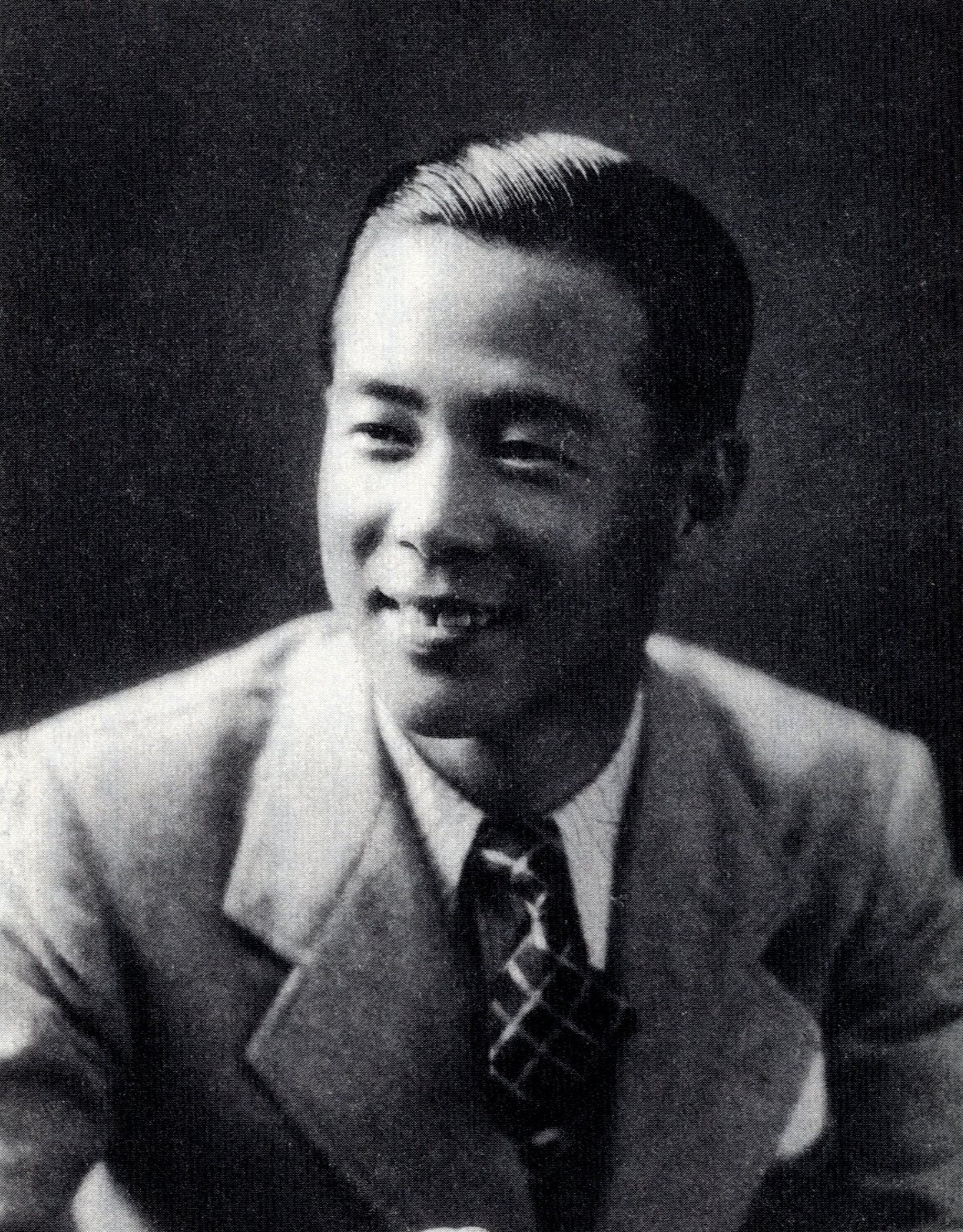

Background information
- Born: Takeo Masunaga; April 8, 1911; Tokyo, Japan
- Died: August 21, 1993 (aged 82)
- Genres: Ryūkōka, classical music
- Occupations: singer, composer, conductor
- Years active: 1921–1993

Ichirō Fujiyama (藤山 一郎, Fujiyama Ichirō; April 8, 1911 – August 21, 1993), born Takeo Masunaga (増永 丈夫, Masunaga Takeo), was a Japanese singer and composer, known for his contribution to Japanese popular music called ryūkōka by his Western classical music skills. He was born in Chūō, Tokyo, and graduated from the Tokyo Music School. Although he was regarded as a tenor singer in Japanese popular music, he was originally a classical baritone singer. He also acted in various films, and was a close friend of Minoru Matsuya (1910–1995). His workroom has been reproduced inside the "NHK museum of broadcasting" as an exhibit.

== Life and career ==
Fujiyama was born Takeo Masunaga in a store in Nihonbashi. He entered the Tokyo Music School and learned Western musical theory under German-born musician Klaus Pringsheim Sr. However, his home had the debt because of the 1923 Great Kantō earthquake.

As ryūkōka singer "Ichirō Fujiyama", he signed with Nippon Columbia, though singing ryūkōka was a taboo for his school. Meeting composer Masao Koga, he debuted with song "Camp Kouta". Fujiyama and Koga also recorded "Sake wa Namida ka Tameiki ka". The song was released and became a big hit in 1931. One theory holds that "Sake wa Namida ka Tameiki ka" sold more than one million copies.

Although Fujiyama immediately became a big star of Japan, his school was very angry and he was once forced to suspend his musical career. In 1933, he graduated from the school and signed with JVC. He released songs such as "Moeru Gojinka" and "Cheerio!" The songs were composed by Shinpei Nakayama and Kunihiko Hashimoto respectively. Further to Japanese popular songs, he sang the Western popular songs. For example, he sang "I Kiss Your Hand, Madame" under its alternative title "Koi no Hanataba" (恋の花束, lit. "Love Flower Bouquet").

He moved to Teichiku Records and then Columbia. During World War II, he also sang gunka such as "Moyuru ōzora", which was composed by Kosaku Yamada. However, he was taken prisoner in Indonesia when the war ended. After he returned to Japan, he released a string of hits such as "Aoi Sanmyaku" and "Nagasaki no Kane", which were composed by Ryoichi Hattori and Yuji Koseki respectively.

Fujiyama retired from Japanese popular music in 1954 when he moved to NHK. However, he had been known as a conductor for the Kōhaku Uta Gassen's "Hotaru no Hikari" until his death. He also composed various school songs for Japanese schools. In 1989, when Emperor Shōwa died, his song "Aoi Sanmyaku" unanticipatedly reached the top in the NHK Top 200 Japanese memorial song rankings of the Shōwa period. He was awarded the People's Honour Award in 1992 and died in 1993.

At the 60th NHK Kōhaku Uta Gassen in 2009, "Aoi Sanmyaku" was sung by NYC Boys as a part of medley "Kōhaku 60th Anniversary NYC Special" (紅白60回記念NYCスペシャル, Kōhaku Rokujukkai Kinen Enuwaishī Supesharu) along with "NYC" and "Yūki 100%" (theme of Nintama Rantarō).

== Tokyo Music School ==
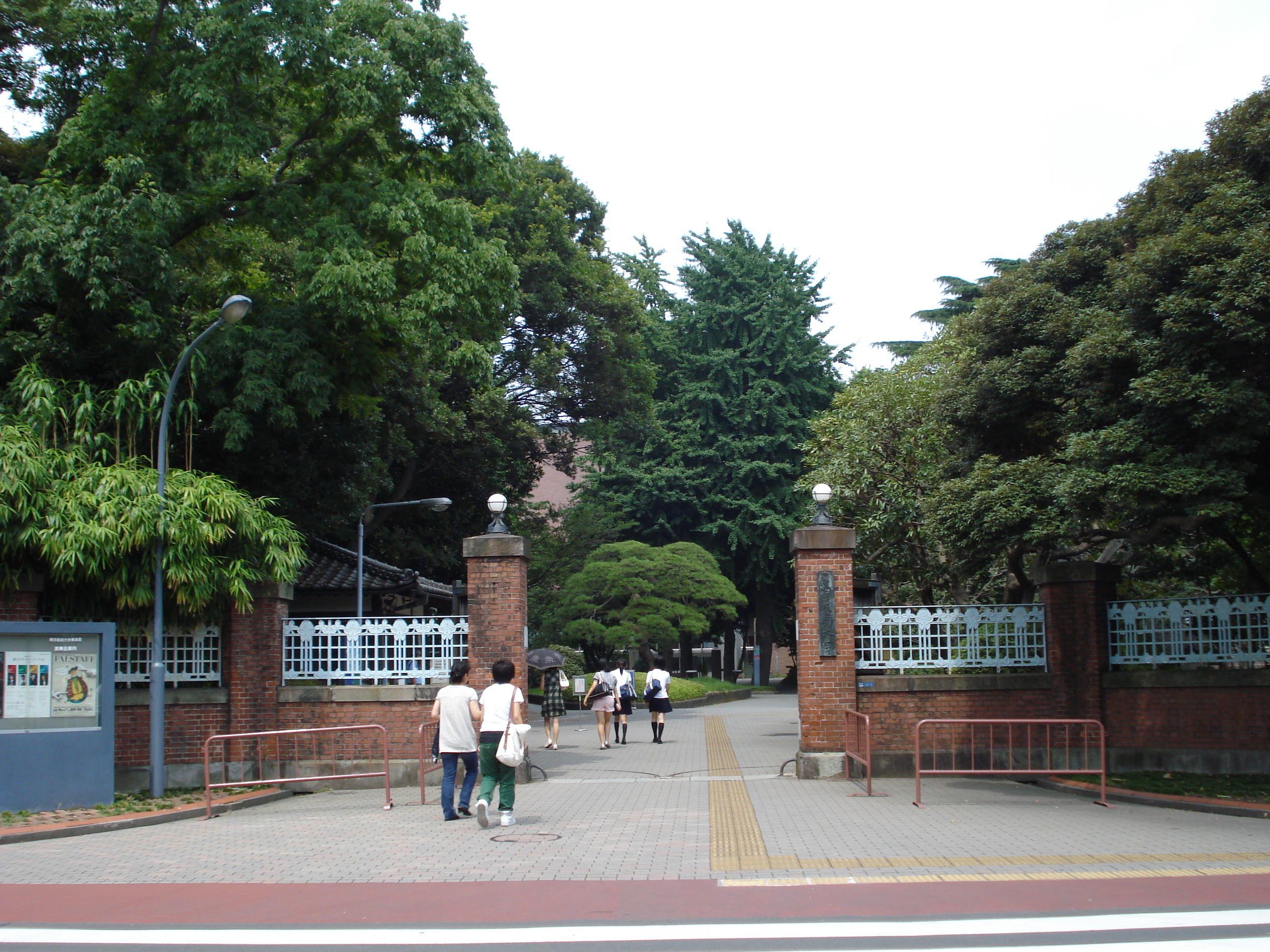
Tokyo University of the Arts, current successor to Tokyo Music School. Pictured is its Ueno Campus.

In April 1929, after graduating from Keio Futsubu School, Fujiyama entered the vocal music department of the Tokyo Music School (later to become Tokyo University of the Arts), the only government-run music school in Japan at the time. During this period, there was a strong social tendency to believe that music and dancing were primarily for women, and Fujiyama was the only male student admitted to the vocal music department. When asked why he wanted to pursue a career in music during the school's entrance examination interview, Fujiyama replied that he wished to become an opera singer.

Fujiyama was ranked 15th out of 30 students in the preliminary vocal performance course and soon after entered the main course. In February 1931, at a performance for students with high academic results, he appeared alongside his classmates to sing songs from Faust and Rigoletto, going on to perform a baritone solo.

Despite a successful student life, at home his family's muslin wholesale store had begun to fall into financial difficulties as a result of the Great Depression's influence in Japan at the time, soon enough resulting in his family incurring a debt of 38,000 yen and being forced to close the business.

Fujiyama began working part-time as a music transcriber to help his family's finances, frequently working for Kōsaku Yamada, in addition to recording records. This was however in violation of Article 58 of the school's regulations prohibiting off-campus performances, resulting in his adoption of the name Ichirō Fujiyama. The name was derived from the kanji in the name of a close friend at the time in combination with the kanji for Mount Fuji. He described to have come up with the name offhandedly in just five minutes.

== Discography ==
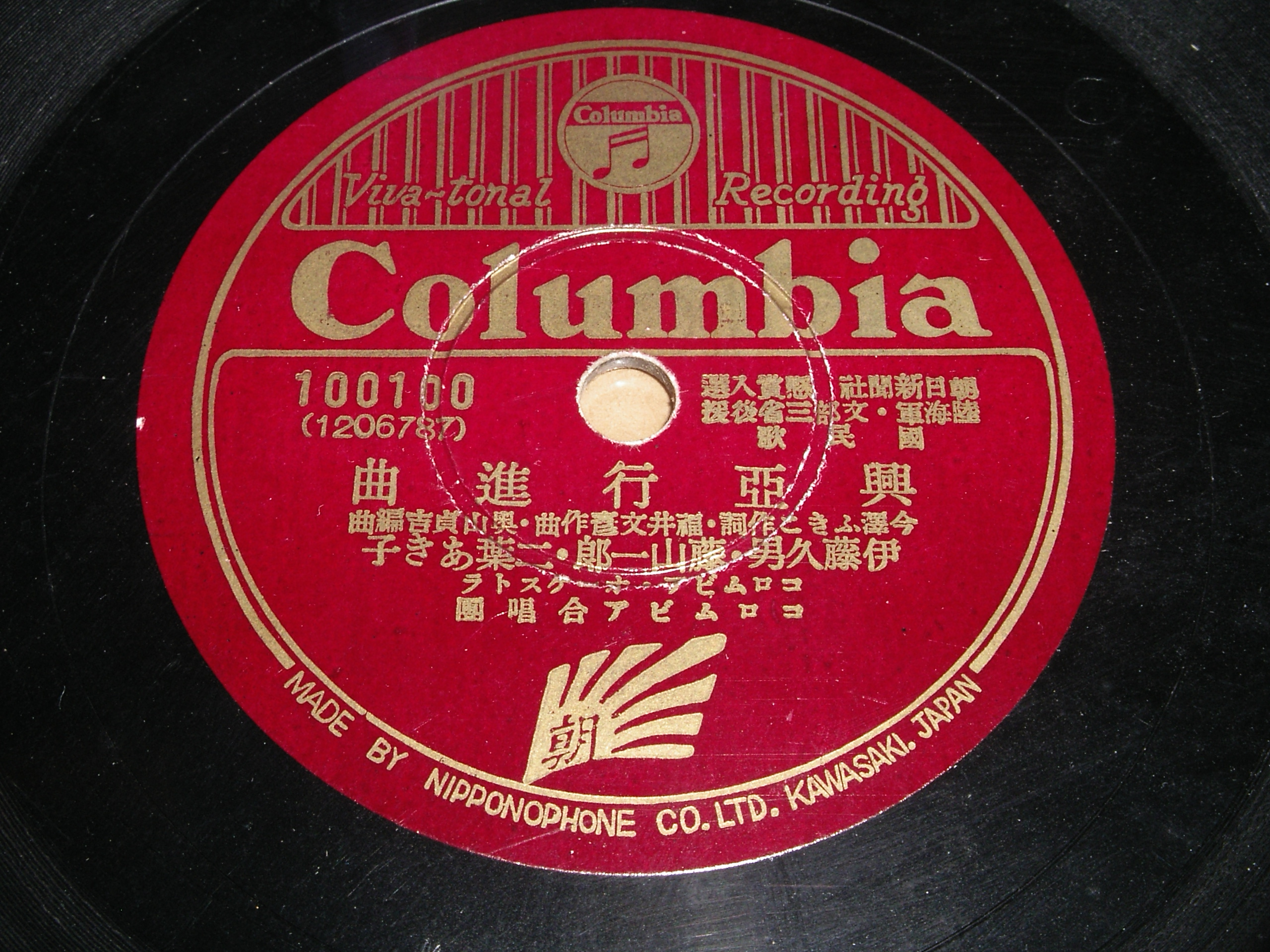
Disc label for Kōa kōshinkyoku (興亞行進曲, Enrich Asia March), sung by Fujiyama, Akiko Futaba and Hisao Ito

- Camp Kouta (キャンプ小唄, Camp Ditty) : 1931
- Sake wa Namida ka Tameiki ka'' (酒は涙か溜息か, Is Sake Tears or Sighs?) : 1931
- Oka o Koe te (丘を越えて, Beyond the Hill) : 1931
- Kage o Shitaite (影を慕いて, Longing for the Shadow; His Cover Version of Chiyako Sato's Song) : 1932
- Boku no Seishun (僕の青春, My Youth) : 1933
- Moeru Gojinka (燃える御神火, Burning Sacred Fire) : 1933
- Cheerio! : 1934
- Aoi Tsuki (蒼い月, Blue Moon; His Version of "Pale Moon") : 1934
- Koi no Hanataba (恋の花束, Flower Bouquet of Love; His Version of "I Kiss Your Hand, Madame") : 1935
- Tokyo Rhapsody (東京ラプソディー) : 1936
- Aikoku Kōsin Kyoku (愛国行進曲, Patriotism March) : 1937
- Shanghai Yakyoku (上海夜曲, Shanghai Nocturne) : 1939
- Natsukashi no Bolero (懐かしのボレロ, Good Old Bolero) : 1939
- Natsukashi no Utagoe (なつかしの歌声, Good Old Singing Voice) : 1940
- Kigen Nisenroppyakunen (紀元二千六百年; The People's Grand Festival in 1940, "God bless the 2600th annual from Emperor Jinmu")
- Sora no Yūshi (空の勇士, Warrior in the Sky; Battle of Khalkhin Gol) : 1940
- Moyuru ōzora (燃ゆる大空, Burning Great Sky; Imperial Japanese Army Air Force) : 1940
- Kōa Kōsinkyoku (興亜行進曲, The Prosperous Asia March) : 1940
- Dase Ichioku no Sokojikara (出せ一億の底力, Show Potential Strengths of 100 Million People) : 1941
- Umi no Shingun (海の進軍, Anabasis in the Sea) : 1941
- Daitōa Kessen no Uta (大東亜決戦の歌, Song of the Greater East Asia War) : 1942
- Kessen no Ōzora e (決戦の大空へ, To the Big Sky for the Decisive War) : 1943
- Ginza Serenade (銀座セレナーデ) : 1946
- Yume Awaki Tokyo (夢淡き東京, Faint Dreaming, Tokyo) : 1947
- Asakusa no Uta (浅草の唄, Song of Asakusa) : 1947
- Aoi sanmyaku (青い山脈, Blue Mountain Range) : 1949
- Nagasaki no Kane (長崎の鐘, The Bells of Nagasaki) : 1949
- Yama no Kanata ni (山のかなたに, Over the Mountain) : 1950
- Nicholai no Kane (ニコライの鐘, The Bells of Nicholai; Holy Resurrection Cathedral) : 1951
- Oka wa Hanazakari (丘は花ざかり, Hill Is Covered with Bloom) : 1952
- Radio Taisō no Uta (ラジオ体操の歌, Song for Radio Gymnastics) : 1956 (as a composer)

== Awards ==
- Japanese Red Cross Society special Medal for Merit (1952)
- NHK Broadcasting Culture Award (1958)
- Social Education Merit Award (1959)
- Medal of Honour with Purple Ribbon (1973)
- Japan Record Award Special Award (1974)
- Order of the Sacred Treasure, Third Class, Gold Rays with Neck Ribbon (April 29, 1982)
- Golden Pheasant Award of the Scout Association of Japan (1992)
- People's Honor Award (May 28, 1992)
- Fourth rank in the order of precedence (August 21, 1993; posthumous)
