= Taishō Roman =

Culture of the Taisho period in Japan

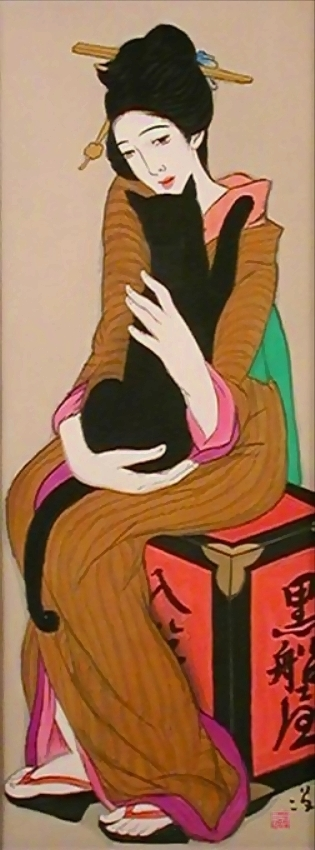
Kurofuneya (1919) by Yumeji Takehisa, preserved at the Takehisa Yumeji Ikaho Memorial in Shibukawa, Gunma Prefecture

Taishō Roman (Japanese: 大正ロマン, 大正浪漫) was the cultural and intellectual movement of Japanese Romanticism during the Taishō era, influenced by European Romanticism. The kanji 浪漫 for Roman is an ateji first introduced by Natsume Sōseki.

According to the 2009 edition of Pocketbook of Taisho Romanticism - The World of Nostalgic & Modern - written by Keiko Ishikawa, who works at the Takehisa Yumeji Museum in Tokyo, the two words "Taishō" and "Roman" were combined because Yumeji Takehisa's works of art in the Taishō era was introduced and described as "romantic" in 1974, the 90th anniversary of his birth. Ishikawa reported findings of her research in the 2009 edition of the Pocketbook, stating that the term was first used at the "Taishō Roman" exhibition in October 1978 held at the Suntory Museum of Art in Tokyo. However, she rewrote in the 2021 edition of the Pocketbook that the term was established in the 1970s, due to earlier usage. Takehisa was a popular painter and poet in the Taishō era, and often cited as a figure representing the culture of Taishō Roman. According to Yumeji Takehisa “Senoo Sheet Music” Cover Art Complete Collection by Minami Takehisa (Yumeji Takehisa's granddaughter) and Naoki Ōhira, he contributed more than 270 cover arts and also 24 lyrics to "Senow Gakufu, or the sheet music books printed by Senoo Music Publishing Company, and his artwork was a major factor in the popularity and commercial success of the books.

== See also ==
- Belle Époque
- Hanshinkan Modernism
- Meisen
- Nostalgia
  - Shōwa nostalgia
- Roaring Twenties, Jazz Age and Années folles
- Weimar culture
