= Ryōichi Hattori =

Japanese pop and jazz composer (1907–1993)

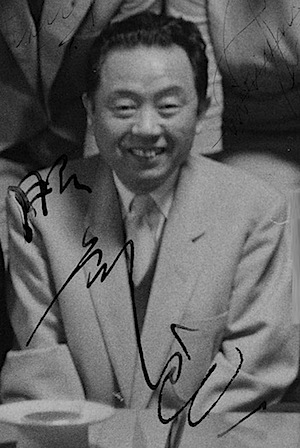
- Ryōichi Hattori in a 1951 publicity photograph
- Born: October 1, 1907; Higashisumiyoshi-ku, Osaka, Japan
- Died: January 30, 1993 (aged 85); Shinagawa, Tokyo, Japan
- Other names: Masao Murasame; Toshi Natsubata
- Occupation: Composer
- Children: Katsuhisa Hattori; Ryoji Hattori/(stage name: Yoshitsugu Hattori)
- Relatives: Takayuki Hattori (grandson); Moné Hattori (great-granddaughter)
- Musical career
- Genres: Ryūkōka; Jazz
- Years active: 1936–1993

Ryōichi Hattori (服部 良一, Hattori Ryōichi; October 1, 1907 – January 30, 1993) was a Japanese pop and jazz composer. Katsuhisa Hattori is his son. He had a great influence on Japanese pop and was awarded the People's Honor Award. Japanese jazz was downtrodden during World War II, but he created a jazz boom after the war. He composed many songs for various artists such as Noriko Awaya, Shizuko Kasagi, Ichimaru and Ichirō Fujiyama. He also composed Li Xianglan's song "Suzhou Nocturne" (蘇州夜曲, Soshū yakyoku), which has remained controversial in China despite not being a militaristic song.
