= Masao Koga =

Japanese composer, guitarist, and mandolinist (1904–1978)

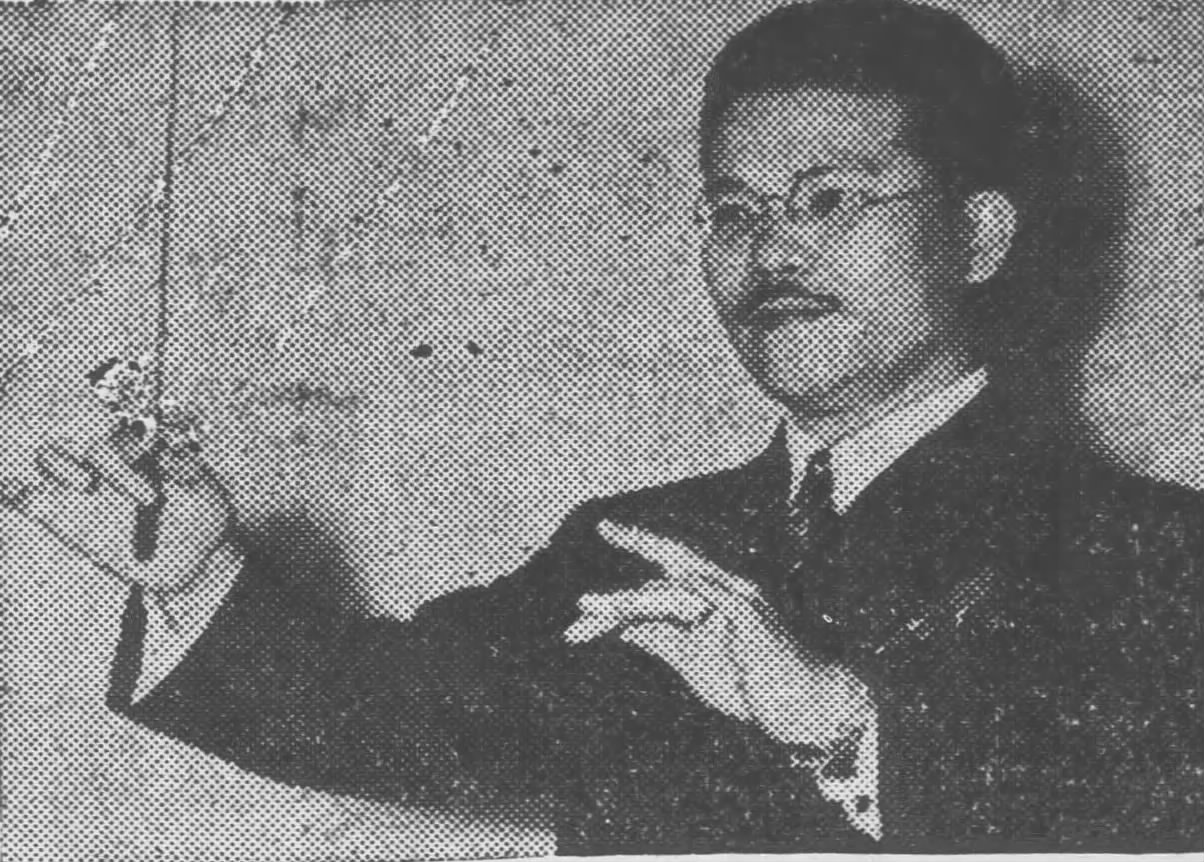

Background information
- Born: 古賀正夫; November 18, 1904; Taguchi, Mizuma District, Fukuoka Prefecture, Empire of Japan
- Died: July 25, 1978 (aged 73) Yoyogi, Shibuya, Tokyo, Japan
- Genres: ryūkōka; kayōkyoku; enka
- Occupations: composer; guitarist; mandolinist
- Instruments: guitar; mandolin
- Years active: 1931–1978
- Labels: Teichiku Records; Nippon Columbia; Nippon Victor

Masao Koga (古賀政男, Koga Masao; November 18, 1904 – July 25, 1978) was a Japanese composer, mandolinist, and guitarist of the Shōwa era who was dubbed "Japan's Irving Berlin" by Universal Press Syndicate. His melancholy style, based upon Nakayama Shimpei's yonanuki scale, was popularly known in Japan as "Koga melody" (古賀メロディー, Koga merodī). He was awarded the Order of the Sacred Treasure (Fourth Class) and the People's Honor Award for his contributions to Japanese music.

== Life ==
Koga was born in 1904 in the village of Taguchi (today part of the city Ōkawa) in the Mizuma District of Fukuoka Prefecture; he was the sixth of eight children. In 1910, Koga's father, Kitarō, died. As a result, Koga, his mother, older sister, and younger brother moved to Korea in 1912, where his eldest brother had migrated for work. His family first traveled to Incheon, before settling in Keijo (today part of Seoul). During this period, Koga was gifted a taishōgoto from his cousin; then later, while enrolled at the Keijō Good Neighbor Trade School, a mandolin from an older brother living in Osaka.

He was regarded as a notable figure for establishing the genre enka, though Koga considered that he was a ryūkōka composer. He wrote numerous songs for Ichiro Fujiyama and Hibari Misora. Koga’s songs have been heard by Western audiences in various films, including Come See the Paradise, and Memoirs of a Geisha. He was the first president of the Japan Composer's Association from 1958 to 1978. A museum was built in Shibuya to honor his achievements, and visitors to the Koga Masao Museum of Music (古賀政男音楽博物館, Koga Masao Ongaku Hakubutsukan) are able to view exhibits, and memorabilia featuring his work.
