= People's Honour Award =

Japanese prize awarded by the Prime Minister

People's Honour Award (国民栄誉賞, Kokumin Eiyoshō) is one of the commendations bestowed by the Prime Minister of Japan on people in recognition of their accomplishments in sport, entertainment, and other fields. The award, not restricted to Japanese nationals, was created in 1977 by the then-Prime Minister Takeo Fukuda.

== Recipients ==
People's Honour Award winners
	Date (Prime Minister)	Recipient (Age)	Occupation	Reason	Other Awards	Reference
1	5 September 1977 (Takeo Fukuda)	Sadaharu Oh (37)	Professional Baseball Player	World record for home runs (868 home runs).	Person of Cultural Merit	
2	4 August 1978 (Takeo Fukuda)	Masao Koga	Composer	Accomplishment as a composer.	従四位; Order of the Sacred Treasure 3rd Class; Medal with Purple Ribbon; 銀杯一個(菊紋)	
3	19 April 1984 (Yasuhiro Nakasone)	Kazuo Hasegawa	Actor	Accomplishments as an actor,	Order of the Sacred Treasure 3rd class; Medal with Purple Ribbon; 銀杯一個(菊紋)	
4	19 April 1984 (Yasuhiro Nakasone)	Naomi Uemura	Adventurer	Successful ascent of the highest mountains of the 5 continents.		
5	9 October 1984 (Yasuhiro Nakasone)	Yasuhiro Yamashita (27)	Judoka	Accomplishments as a judoka.	Medal with Purple Ribbon; 銀杯一組(菊紋)	
6	22 June 1987 (Yasuhiro Nakasone)	Sachio Kinugasa (40)	Professional Baseball Player	World record for consecutive games played.		
7	6 July 1989 (Sōsuke Uno)	Kazue Kato (Hibari Misora)	Singer	Giving the people hope and dream via songs	Medal with Dark Blue Ribbon	
8	29 September 1989 (Toshiki Kaifu)	Mitsugu Akimoto (Chiyonofuji Mitsugu)	Professional Sumo wrestler	Record for wins as a sumo wrestler	従四位; Order of the Rising Sun	
9	28 May 1992 (Kiichi Miyazawa)	Takeo Masunaga (Ichiro Fujiyama)	Singer	Giving the people hope and encouragement via songs with beautiful Japanese language	従四位; Order of the Sacred Treasure 3rd Class; Medal with Purple Ribbon; 銀杯一個(菊紋)	
10	28 July 1992 (Kiichi Miyazawa)	Machiko Hasegawa	Manga artist	家庭漫画を通じて戦後の我が国社会に潤いと安らぎを与えた	Order of the Precious Crown 4th Class; Medal with Purple Ribbon	
11	26 February 1993 (Kiichi Miyazawa)	Ryōichi Hattori	Composer	数多くの歌謡曲を作り国民に希望と潤いを与えた	従四位; Order of the Sacred Treasure 3rd Class; Medal with Purple Ribbon; 銀杯一個(菊紋)	
12	3 September 1996 (Ryutaro Hashimoto)	Kiyoshi Atsumi	Actor	映画「男はつらいよ」シリーズを通じ人情味豊かな演技で広く国民に喜びと潤いを与えた	Medal with Purple Ribbon; 銀杯一個(菊紋)	
13	7 July 1998 (Ryutaro Hashimoto)	Tadashi Yoshida	Composer	「吉田メロディー」の作曲により国民に夢と希望と潤いを与えた	従四位; 勲三等 旭日中綬章; Medal with Purple Ribbon	
14	1 October 1998 (Keizo Obuchi)	Akira Kurosawa	Film Director	数々の不朽の名作によって国民に深い感動を与えるとともに世界の映画史に輝かしい足跡を残した	従三位; Order of Culture; 銀杯一組(菊紋)	
15	30 October 2000 (Yoshiro Mori)	Naoko Takahashi (28)	Athlete	Athletics at the 2000 Summer Olympics - Women's marathon Gold medal	銀杯一組(菊紋)	
16	23 January 2009 (Taro Aso)	Minoru Endo	Composer	世代を超えて長く愛唱される、情感に満ちあふれた名曲を数多く世に送り出した。	正四位; Order of the Rising Sun; Person of Cultural Merit; Medal with Purple Ribbon	
17	1 July 2009 (Taro Aso)	Mitsuko Mori (89)	Actress	長年にわたって芸能分野の第一線で活躍し、特に『放浪記』において2000回を超える主演を務めた。	従三位; Order of Culture; 勲三等瑞宝章; Person of Cultural Merit; Medal with Purple Ribbon	
18	22 December 2009 (Yukio Hatoyama)	Hisaya Morishige	Actor			
19	18 August 2011 (Naoto Kan)	Japan women's national football team	National football team	Winning the 2011 FIFA Women's World Cup.		
20	7 November 2012 (Yoshihiko Noda)	Saori Yoshida (30)	Wrestler			
21	25 February 2013 (Shinzō Abe)	Taihō Kōki	Professional Sumo Wrestler		Medal with Purple Ribbon; Order of Culture	
22; 23	5 May 2013 (Shinzō Abe)	Shigeo Nagashima (77); Hideki Matsui (38)	Professional Baseball Player; Professional Baseball Player			
24	20 October 2016 (Shinzō Abe)	Kaori Icho (32)	Wrestler	Being the first woman to win four consecutive Olympic gold medals.	Medal with Purple Ribbon	
25; 26	13 February 2018 (Shinzō Abe)	Yoshiharu Habu (47); Yuta Iyama (28)	Professional Shogi Player; Professional Go Player	Habu: becoming the first shogi player to win lifetime titles for all seven major title matches, and the only shogi player to hold 7 major titles simultaneously. Iyama: becoming the first go player to simultaneously hold all seven major titles on two separate occasions.	Habu: Medal with Purple Ribbon; Prime Minister's Award; Iyama: Prime Minister's Award	
27	2 July 2018 (Shinzō Abe)	Yuzuru Hanyu (23)	Figure skater	Becoming the first male figure skater in 66 years to defend Olympic gold; historic accomplishments in figure skating; giving hope and courage to society.	Medal with Purple Ribbon	
28	3 March 2023 (Fumio Kishida)	Kunieda Shingo (39)	wheelchair tennis player	With four Paralympic gold medals, 28 major singles titles and 50 major titles overall, Kunieda is the first parasports athlete to be honored.	award and shield	

== Known to have declined the honor ==
- Yutaka Fukumoto (1983)
- Yūji Koseki (1989, by the bereaved family)
- Ichiro Suzuki (2001, 2004, 2019)
- Shohei Ohtani (2021)
