= Noriko Awaya =

Japanese female soprano chanteuse (1907-1999)

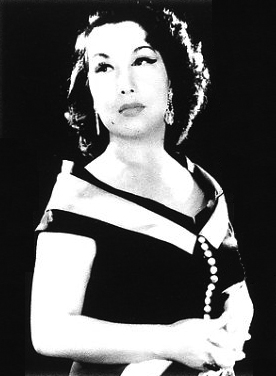

Background information
- Born: 淡谷のり (Awaya Nori); August 12, 1907; Aomori, Japan,
- Died: September 22, 1999 (aged 92) Tokyo, Japan
- Genres: Ryūkōka, Chanson
- Occupation: Singer
- Years active: 1929–1999

Noriko Awaya (Japanese: 淡谷 のり子, Hepburn: Awaya Noriko; August 12, 1907 – September 22, 1999) was a Japanese female soprano chanteuse and popular music (ryūkōka) singer. She was dubbed the "Queen of Blues" (ブルースの女王, Burūsu no Joō) in Japan.

== Life and career ==
Awaya was born as Nori Awaya (淡谷のり, Awaya Nori) in Aomori, Aomori Prefecture, Japan. She was the oldest daughter of a wealthy merchant, whose business went bankrupt while his daughter was in her teenage years. In 1910, her family's home was destroyed in the Aomori City fire. In 1923 she, along with her mother and younger sister, went to Tokyo. There, she was admitted to the piano department of a music school. Later, her disposition towards singing was discovered and she was admitted to the vocal department. With the aim of becoming an opera singer, she made an extensive study of classical music. However, due to her family's poverty, she was forced to leave school for a year and worked as a nude model. Eventually, she returned to the music academy, and graduated top of her class in 1929.

She became a classical singer. However, she soon began to sing popular songs because the salary of a classical music performer was very low. Her 1937 song "Farewell Blues" (別れのブルース, Wakare no Burūsu) became a hit. In 1938, she also released "Rainy Blues" (雨のブルース, Ame no Burūsu). In Taiwan, the song was later given the alternative title "Han Yu Qu" (寒雨曲). In 1939, she recorded the song "Yoru no Platform" (夜のプラットホーム, Night Platform) as an insert song of the movie Tokyo no Josei, in which Setsuko Hara played the main role. However, the song was banned by Japanese authorities.

Awaya had a daughter outside marriage. In her old age, she criticized enka. She also criticized Hideki Saijo and Seiko Matsuda because Saijo enjoyed dancing and Matsuda sang songs without feeling. She said that songs without pain, distress and effort were frauds. Kenichi Mikawa respected her. In 1996, Awaya gave Mikawa her song "Rainy Blues" at her final live performance. She was elected an honorary citizen by her hometown Aomori City in 1998 and died in 1999.

In 2007, Hideaki Tokunaga covered Awaya's song "Farewell Blues" at a concert.

The use of the term 'blues' in some song titles is misleading, as the songs bear no resemblance to western blues. Instead, they referred to slow melancholic songs, known commonly in Japan as kayōkyoku.

== Discography ==
=== Singles ===
- Yoru no Tokyo (夜の東京, Night Tokyo) : 1929
- Love Parade : 1930
- Veny Ven : 1934
- Dona Marriquita : 1935
- Poema : 1935
- Barcelona : 1935
- Teresina : 1935
- Dardanella : 1936
- Morucha : 1936
- Kurai Nichiyōbi (暗い日曜日; Cover of "Gloomy Sunday") : 1936
- Wakare no Blues (別れのブルース, Blues for Farewell) : 1937
- Madiana : 1937
- Amapola : 1937
- Ame no Blues (雨のブルース, Rainy Blues) : 1938
- Rumba Tambah : 1938
- La Cumparsita : 1939
- La Seine : 1952
- My Shawl : 1952
- Romance : 1953
- Maria la O : 1959
- Adieu : 1959
- Wasurerarenai Blues (忘れられないブルース, Unforgettable Blues) : 1960
- Ame no Hi no Wakare/Last Song (雨の日の別離/ラスト・ソング, Separation at the Rainy Day/Last Song) : 1982
- Yuri Isu (揺り椅子, Rocking Chair) : 1993

=== Albums ===
- Mukashi Hitori no Utaite ga Ita (昔一人の歌い手がいた, In those days, there was a singer) : 1971
- Noriko Awaya 50th Anniversary : 1978 album including song "Charmaine"
- Last Song : 1982
- Mizuiro no Waltz/Uta wa Ikiteiru (水色のワルツ/歌は生きている, Light Blue Waltz/Songs are Alive) : 1988
- Uta koso Waga Kokoro no Dress (うたこそ我が心のドレス, Songs Is the Dress of My Heart) : 1993
- Watashi no Sukina Uta: mes cheres chansons Noriko Awaya (私の好きな歌~mes cheres chansons Noriko Awaya, My Favorite Songs: My Dear Chansons Noriko Awaya) : 2000 – Triple-CD greatest-hits album set just after her death
- Columbia Otokuban Series Noriko Awaya (コロムビア音得盤シリーズ 淡谷のり子, Columbia Music Good Record Series Noriko Awaya) : 2003 compilation
- Noriko Awaya Zenkyokushū (淡谷のり子全曲集, Noriko Awaya All Music Collection) : 2004 compilation
- Colezo! Noriko Awaya Best (＜ＣＯＬＥＺＯ！＞淡谷のり子 ベスト, This Is the Best of Noriko Awaya) : 2005 compilation
- Showa Archives Noriko Awaya Meishōshū (昭和アーカイブス 淡谷のり子名唱集, Showa Archives Noriko Awaya Good Singing Collection) : 2007 compilation
- Golden Best Noriko Awaya: Chanson Album : 2009 compilation
- Awaya Noriko: Burūsu no Joō (淡谷のり子～ブルースの女王～, Noriko Awaya: Queen of Blues) : 2010 compilation

== Kōhaku Uta Gassen appearances ==
Year	#	Song	No.	VS	Remarks
1953 (Showa 28)/4th	1	Addu (アデュー)	17/17	Ichirō Fujiyama	Finale
1954 (Showa 29)/5th	2	Kareha (枯葉)	12/15	Itou Hisao	
1956 (Showa 31)/7th	3	Muruha Tamuba (ムルハ・タムバ)	8/24	Dick Mine	
1957 (Showa 32)/8th	4	Ame No Tokyo (雨の東京)	6/25	Itou Hisao (2)	
1958 (Showa 33)/9th	5	Barairo No Jinsei (ばら色の人生)	21/25	Dick Mine (2)	
1959 (Showa 34)/10th	6	Ame No Blues (雨のブルース)	19/25	Katsuhiko Haida	
1960 (Showa 35)/11th	7	Wakarerarenai Blues (忘れられないブルース)	17/25	Isao Hayashi	
1961 (Showa 36)/12th	8	Maria Rao (マリア・ラオ)	19/25	Itou Hisao (3)	
1964 (Showa 39)/15th	9	Wakare No Blues (別れのブルース)	19/25	Itou Hisao (4)	
