= Taro Shoji =

Tarō Shōji 東海林 太郎
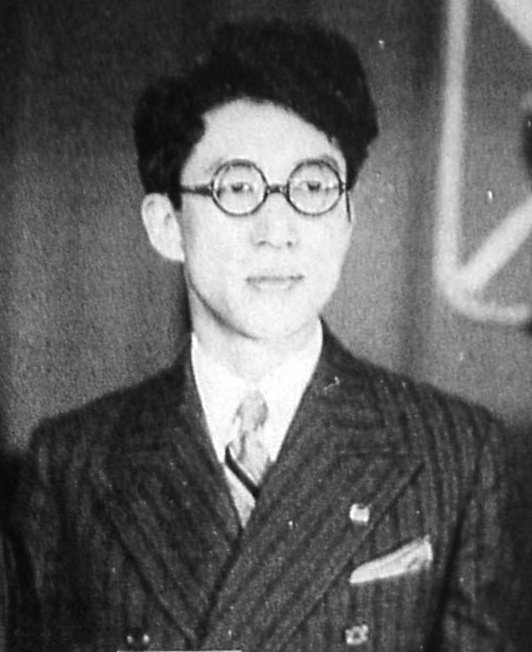

Background information
- Also known as: Shōji Shirō (庄司史郎); Asabuki Kaoru (朝吹薫); Fujiwara Hideo (藤原英夫)
- Born: Shōji Tarō; December 11, 1898; Akita, Akita Prefecture, Japan
- Died: October 4, 1972 (aged 73) Tachikawa, Tokyo
- Genres: Ryūkōka
- Instruments: Vocals
- Years active: 1933–1972

Tarō Shōji (Japanese: 東海林 太郎, Hepburn: Shōji Tarō; December 11, 1898 – October 4, 1972) was a popular Japanese ryūkōka singer. He also used the aliases Shōji Shirō (庄司史郎), Asabuki Kaoru (朝吹薫), and Fujiwara Hideo (藤原英夫) in his early recording career.

== Early life ==
Shōji was born in Akita, Akita Prefecture. His father was an employee of the South Manchuria Railway, and his parents moved to Manchukuo, leaving him behind in Japan to be raised by his grandmother, who introduced him to the violin. He graduated from the Waseda University Department of Commerce, where he majored in Marxist economics. He married shortly before graduation from undergraduate studies, and was employed by the South Manchurian Railways Research Division on completion of his graduated degree in 1923. His main work at the South Manchurian Railways was on unionization; however, his highly leftist viewpoints alienated both his managers and the Imperial Japanese Army, and he found himself sidelined to a position in a library. After seven years in Manchukuo, he returned to Japan, where his brother was running a Chinese restaurant near Waseda University.

== Music career ==
Shōji made his debut as a recording singer in 1933. He attempted to become a Western classical baritone singer, but finally became a popular singer. His first major hit popular song Akagi no Komoriuta (赤城の子守唄, "Akagi Lulaby") written about Kunisada Chūji. The song was released in 1934 and sold 400,000 copies. This song became a model for many lesser known singers in the 1930s and early 1940s about tragic or semi-tragic Japanese anti-heroes.

From 1934 to 1936, the young actress Hideko Takamine and her mother lived with Shōji, although she refused his offer to formally adopt her.

After World War II, many of his songs were banned by the American occupation forces as too nationalistic. In the 1960s, his popularity revived, riding a wave of nostalgia for songs of the early Shōwa period. Shōji appeared four times on the NHK Kōhaku Uta Gassen, starting with the first broadcast in 1951, followed by 1955, 1956 and 1965. He performed at the Asakusa International Theater in 1957 and in 1963 became honorary chairman of the Japan Vocalist Association in 1963. He was awarded the “special recognition” award at the Japan Record Awards in 1965 and the 4th class of the Order of the Rising Sun in 1969.

== Death ==
Shōji suffered from cancer. However, he recovered from the illness in 1964. He died from cerebral hemorrhage in 1972.

== Partial discography ==
- Egasa Higasa (絵傘日傘, Graphic umbrella Sun umbrella) : 1933
- Akagi no Komoriuta (赤城の子守唄, Berceuse of Akagi) : 1934
- Kurai Nichiyōbi (暗い日曜日; His cover version of "Gloomy Sunday") : 1936
- Mugi to Heitai (麦と兵隊, Wheat and Soldier) : 1938
- Aozora Dochu (青空道中; Road to Blue Skies) : 1938 with Shinbashi Kiyozo
- Butaichō to Heitai (部隊長と兵隊, Unit Commander and Soldier) : 1938 with Bin Uehara
- Senjō Hatsu Butai (戦場初舞台, Battleground First Stage) : 1940
- Gunkoku Maiougi (軍国舞扇, Militarist Dancer Fan) : 1941
