= Shinpei Nakayama =

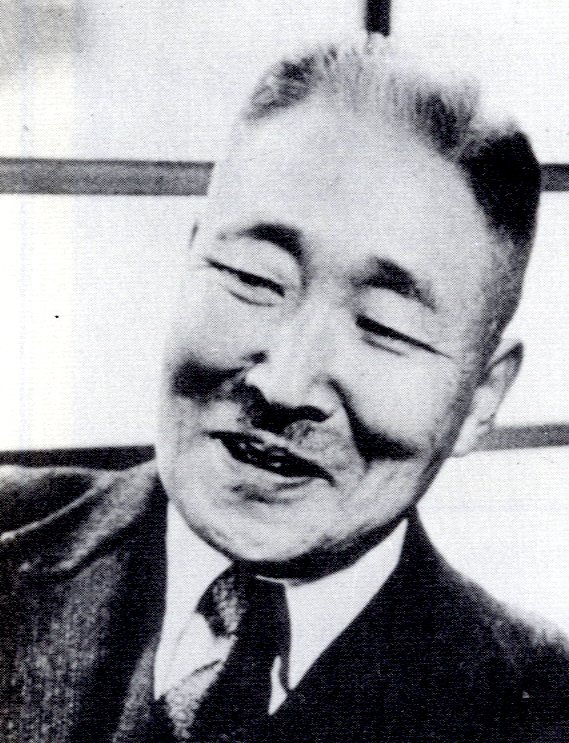
Shimpei Nakayama in the 1950s

Shimpei Nakayama (中山 晋平, Nakayama Shimpei; March 22, 1887 – December 30, 1952) was a Japanese songwriter famous for his many children's songs (warabe uta) and popular songs (ryūkōka) that have become deeply embedded in Japanese popular culture.

== Early life ==
Nakayama was born in 1887 in Nakano City, Nagano Prefecture. His father died when he was very young, so he and his siblings were raised by his mother Zō, who often took in washing and sewing to make ends meet.

Nakayama was first interested in music when he attended Nakano Elementary School, where he and his classmates would sing to the accompaniment of a small organ (what he called a "baby organ"). The songs they sang included popular military marches from the First Sino-Japanese War (1894–95). At one point, a small brass band sponsored by the Salvation Army came to his town to play, and Nakayama remembers being smitten by the sound. His classmates remember him as an accomplished player of the Japanese transverse flute who would often play during Obon and other festivals at the local Shinto shrines and Buddhist temple.

When Shimpei graduated from elementary school, he took the required examinations and became a substitute elementary school teacher. His dream was to become a music teacher, which required him to go to school in Tokyo. He moved there in 1905, where he became a household servant for Shimamura Hōgetsu, an English literature professor at Waseda University.

== Career ==
In 1914, Nakayama composed the song "Katyusha's song (カチューシャの唄)" for a dramatization of Leo Tolstoy's 1899 novel Resurrection. The song, sung by actress Sumako Matsui, was a massive hit and Nakayama became famous almost overnight. Today, this song is considered one of the earliest examples of modern Japanese popular music.

In 1915, Nakayama released the romantic ballad "Gondola no Uta (ゴンドラの唄)", which was featured prominently in Akira Kurosawa's 1952 film Ikiru.

In the 1930s, his song "Tokyo ondo" became a great countrywide hit. Today, it is also known as the theme song of baseball team Tokyo Yakult Swallows.

Nakayama's most famous children's songs (warabe uta) include "Shabondama (シャボン玉)", "Teru-teru-bōzu (てるてる坊主)", "Amefuri", "Ano machi kono machi" and "Sekurabe", among others.
