= Hamako Watanabe =

Japanese singer

Hamako Watanabe 渡辺 はま子
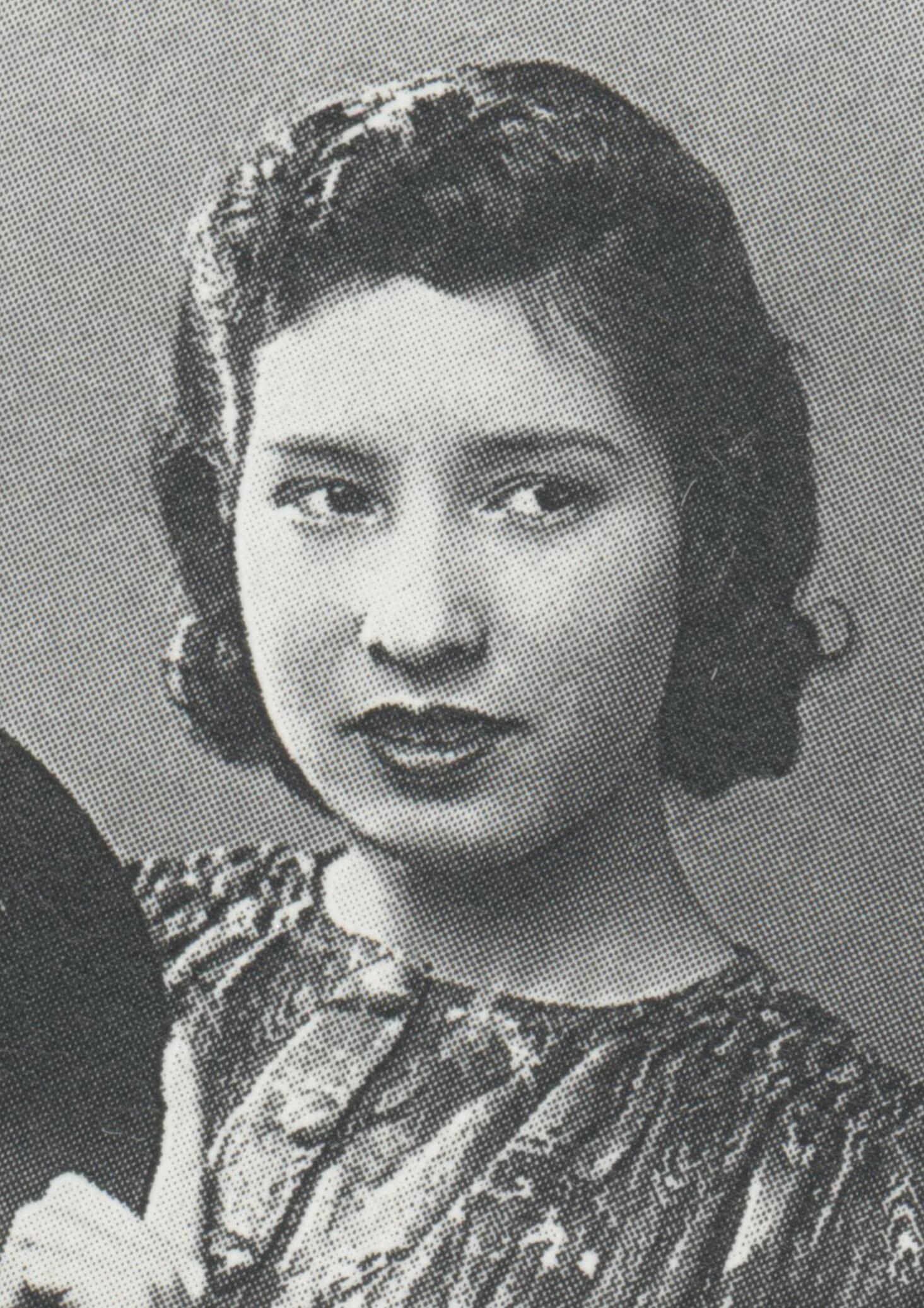
- Hamako Watanabe in 1938

Background information
- Born: Hamako Kato (加藤 浜子); October 27, 1910; Yokohama, Japan
- Died: December 31, 1999 (aged 89) Yokohama, Japan
- Years active: 1934-1989

Hamako Watanabe (渡辺 はま子, Watanabe Hamako; 27 October 1910 – 31 December 1999) was the stage name of a Japanese popular singer, who was active during the Shōwa period of Japan, before, during and after World War II. Her real name was Hamako Kato.

== Early career ==
Watanabe was born and raised in Yokohama, and claimed that her grandfather was a quarter American. She graduated from the Musashino Academia Musicae in 1933, and soon obtained a job as a music instructor at the Yokohama Gakuen Women’s High School. However, the same year, she won an audition at Polydor Records, but after only one song (which was not released), her contract was not renewed. Per the advice and recommendation of Tamaki Tokuyama, her mentor from the Musashino Academia, she transferred to Victor, who released her debut song in 1934.

Her acting debut also occurred the same year at a stage musical at the Hibya Public Hall in Tokyo. When the lead singer, Chikoko Kobayashi suddenly dropped out of the performance, Watanabe was quickly promoted to understudy, and played the role of a fisherman’s daughter alongside Ichirō Fujiyama and Roppa Furukawa. She resigned from teaching in 1935. In the mid-1930s, Watanabe had a number of hit songs. However, government censors came down on her in 1936 over the risqué lyrics on a number of her songs.

== Wartime years ==
In April 1937, Watanabe transferred from Victor to Columbia Records, which was then producing mostly patriotic songs. Her song, Aikoku no hana (“Flower of Patriotism”, 1938) was an immediate hit. She was sent to China during the Second Sino-Japanese War to raise morale among the troops, and visited many locations in Japanese-occupied China. The release of Shina no yoru ("Night in China", 1938) and Kanton buruzu ("Canton Blues", 1938) further boosted her popularity, especially after Shina no yoru was made into a hit movie by the Manchukuo Film Association, starring Ri Koran. During this time, Watanabe often performed wearing Chinese dress, and many of her songs incorporated traditional Chinese melodies or phrases of Chinese lyrics. At the surrender of Japan, Watanabe was based in Tianjin and was placed in a prisoner of war camp for over a year.

== Post-war career ==
After her repatriation to Japan, Watanabe married in 1947, and opened a flower shop in Yokohama, while attempting to restart her career. She continued to produce a number of hit songs in the later 1940s, including Tokyo no yoru ("Tokyo Nights", 1947), Adieu Shanghai (1948), Yokohama monogatari ("Yokohama Story", 1950). In 1950, she participated in the first tour of Japanese artists to the United States, making performances in various cities, and capitalizing on her part-American ancestry. In 1952, she made a number of trips to the Philippines, where her songs remained very popular, in part to ask Philippine President Elpidio Quirino to pardon the Japanese prisoners remaining in the Philippines and to let them return home.

From 1951 through 1958, and in 1964 and 1973, Watanabe participated in the year-end Kōhaku Uta Gassen held by NHK. In 1965, together with Taro Shoji, she established an association for Japanese vocal performers. She was awarded the Purple Ribbon by the Japanese government in 1973, along with the Japan Record Award and the 4th class of the Order of the Precious Crown in 1981. She was again awarded the Japan Record Award in 1982. The death of her husband in 1985 came as a severe shock to Watanabe, and she was diagnosed with dementia soon afterwards. She announced her retirement in 1989, but made one more public appearance in 1990 for charity at the Mito Prefectural Culture center in Mito, Ibaraki. A stroke in 1993 left her bedridden until her death at the end of 1999 from a cerebral infarction.

Her life story was made into a television movie, Senjō no Melody, released on Fuji TV in September 2009, with Hiroko Yakushimaru playing the role of Watanabe.

== Kōhaku Uta Gassen Appearances ==
| Year | # | Song | No. | VS | Remarks |
|---|---|---|---|---|---|
| 1951 (Showa 26)/1st | 1 | San Francisco No Chinatown (桑港のチャイナ街) | 7/7 | Ichirō Fujiyama | Finale |
| 1952 (Showa 27)/2nd | 2 | Hi No Tori (火の鳥) | 12/12 | Ichirō Fujiyama (2) | Finale (2) |
| 1953 (Showa 28)/4th* | 3 | Ā Montenrupa No Yoru Wa Fukete (あゝモンテンルパの夜は更けて) | 16/17 | Isao Hayashi | First Finale |
| 1954 (Showa 29)/5th | 4 | Tokyo No Bara (東京の薔薇) | 15/15 | Kirishima Noboru | Finale (3) |
| 1956 (Showa 31)/7th | 5 | San Francisco No Chinatown (2) | 22/24 | Itou Hisao | Returned after 2 years |
| 1957 (Showa 32)/8th | 6 | Ieraishan (夜来香) | 18/25 | Ichirō Fujiyama (3) | |
| 1958 (Showa 33)/9th | 7 | Nagasaki No Ochousan (長崎のお蝶さん) | 14/25 | Itou Hisao (2) | |
| 1964 (Showa 39)/15th | 8 | San Francisco No Chinatown (3) | 4/25 | Ichirō Fujiyama (4) | Returned after 6 years |
| 1973 (Showa 48)/24th | # | San Francisco No Chinatown (4) | 19/23 | Ichirō Fujiyama (5) | Special performance, returned after 9 years |

- 1953 NHK hosted Kouhaku two times.
