= Tamaki Tokuyama =

Japanese baritone (1903–1942)

Tamaki Tokuyama 徳山璉
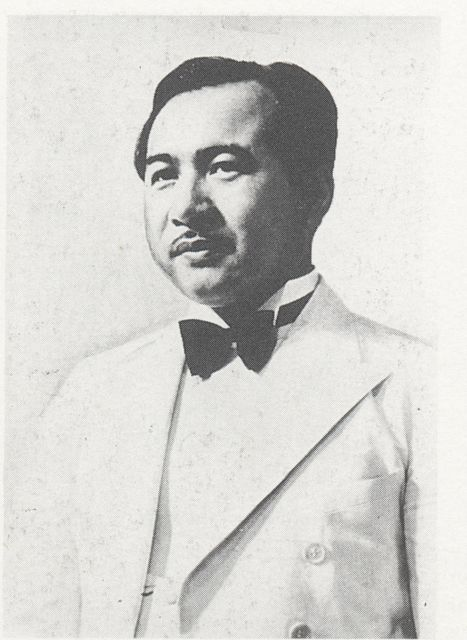

Background information
- Born: July 27, 1903; Kōza District, Kanagawa Prefecture, Empire of Japan
- Died: January 28, 1942 (aged 38) Kugenuma, Kanagawa Prefecture, Empire of Japan
- Genres: Ryūkōka, gunka, min'yō, classical music
- Occupations: Singer, film actor
- Years active: 1930–1942
- Labels: Nippon Columbia, Nippon Victor Co.

Tamaki Tokuyama (徳山 璉, Tokuyama Tamaki; July 27, 1903 – January 28, 1942) was a classically trained baritone and a famous singer of popular music in early Shōwa era Japan.

== Life and career ==
Tokuyama was born to a medical practitioner on July 27, 1903, in a village in Kanagawa Prefecture's Kōza District, west of Yokohama. After completing high school, Tokuyama enrolled in the Tokyo School of Music (later part of the Tokyo University of the Arts). Upon completing his studies there, he became a faculty member of the Musashino Academia Musicae.

He accompanied Chiyako Sato (佐藤千夜子, Satō Chiyako) as a piano player, who was also a graduate from Tokyo University of Arts. Satō became the first female best selling ryūkōka singer soon after the radio broadcasting began in 1925 and had a contract with Nippon Victor Company.

In 1930 Tokuyama was signed a record contract with Nippon Victor Company where he would remain for the rest of his life. His song "Samurai Nippon" (侍ニッポン)—its lyrics based on an eponymous novel by Jirōmasa Gunji that was popular at the time—became a hit in 1931, a success that was followed shortly thereafter with the comic song "Runpen Bushi" (ルンペン節; "runpen" is adapted from the German word for "rag" or "vagrant"). The humorous lyrics and operetta-like quality of the song earned it wide popularity and made Tokuyama one of Nippon Victor Company's biggest singing stars of the 1930s.

In 1932 he recorded a duet with Fumiko Yotsuya called Tengoku ni musubu koi (天國に結ぶ戀; trans. "A Love Bound in Heaven"), which was inspired by a notorious double suicide that had occurred in Sakatayama earlier that year.

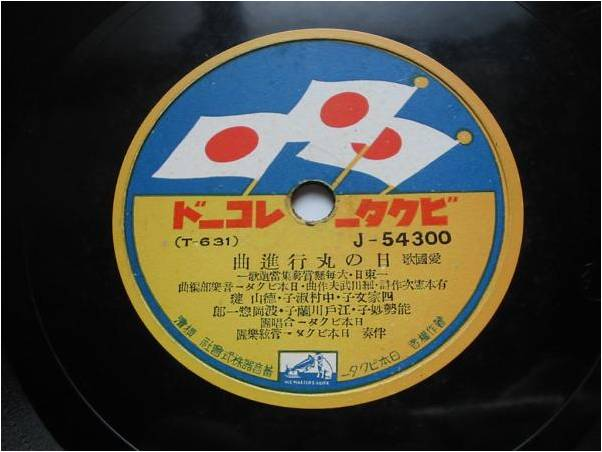
Nippon Victor Company's 1938 recording of the "Hinomaru March" (Note: Singers for "Hinomaru March" included Tamaki Tokuyama and Fumiko Yotsuya, Toshiko Nakamura, Taeko Nose, Ranko Edogawa, Sōichirō Namioka, and the Nippon Victor Orchestra with their chorus and junior chorus.)

Later Tokuyama became a noted exponent of gunka, recording very popular renditions of such songs as the Hinomaru March (日の丸行進曲) and Patriotic March (愛國行進曲). In early 1940s he released a propaganda song Tonarigumi (隣組; trans; "Neighborhood Association") promoting the home front, though the song itself has been covered by artists with subsequently altered lyrics. (Note: Those altered lyrics for Tonatigumi ("Neighborhood Association") were used for TV commercial messages for insectiside to bottled whisky, and sung over a decade as the theme song for a very popular TV comedy show played by Drifters) LP and CD reissues of his work in subsequent decades have tended to focus on his recordings in this genre.

Tokuyama was also a famous film and theatrical actor, often appearing together with his friend, the comedian Roppa Furukawa and his troop, in musical films what they called "Cine-operetta" (operetta movie) in the early 1930s, with best known Utau Yajikita (歌ふ弥次喜多 trans. "Operetta Yaji and Kita"). That program led them to perform in 1935 at Yūrakuza the most prestigious theater in central Tokyo then with guest performance by Fujiwara Yoshie.

For theatrical performances those popular programs as Tōkaidōchū Hizakurige (東海道中膝栗毛) and Garamasadon ( ガラマサどん) made them very popular. As a singer with classical music background, he did not hesitate to include comic songs Marumarubushi (マルマル節) with Roppa Furukawa. It was his vocal part that attracted their audience as Tokuyama's singing style was so distinctive that not many audience heard before, while the idea of singing songs was to apply traditional vocalization called "kobushi" that other ryūkōka singers were used to.

He also continued his career as a classical singer of opera, lieder, and chansons; making notable appearances in Japanese productions of Carmen and Hansel and Gretel, as well as singing the bass part in performances of Beethoven's Symphony No. 9. Though his career as a classical singer was an important part of Tokuyama's life, it remains mostly unknown as he cut very few classical records and none of them have ever been reissued outside of the original 78s.

In 1935 Tokuyama married Hisako Yagitani and settled down in the town of Kugenuma, near his birthplace. He died prematurely from complications from sepsis on January 28, 1942, at the age of 38. Tokuyama is buried in the graveyard of the Jōkō-ji in Fujisawa.

== Select discography ==
- Tatake taiko (叩け太鼓 Beating the Drum) 1930
- Aika (哀歌 Jules Massenet's Élégie sung in Japanese, with Kunihiko Hashimoto on violin) 1931
- Samurai Nippon (侍ニッポン Samurai Japan) 1931
- Runpen bushi (ルンペン節 Free-loader's Tune) 1931
- Tengoku ni musubu koi (天國に結ぶ戀 A Love Bound in Heaven) 1932
- Yoru no sakaba ni (夜の酒場に Night at the Bar) 1932
- Koi ni naku (戀に泣く Tearful in Love) 1933
- Aikoku Kōshinkyoku (愛國行進曲 Patriotic March) 1937
- Sararīman-yo (サラリーマンよ Oh Salaryman) 1937
- Maru-maru bushi (〇〇ぶし) 1938
- Hinomaru kōshinkyoku (日の丸行進曲 Hinomaru March) 1938
- Tonarigumi (隣組 Neighborhood Association) 1940

== Bibliography ==
- Tokuyama Tamaki (1933). Seigaku Shoho Renshū (Basic Workbook for Chorus – Chorübungen der Münchener Musikschule) 聲樂初歩練習 : コールユーブンゲン解説. Tokyo: Shunjusha. World Music Classes Series 4,40. Non-commercial, could be the text book for his classes at Musashino Academia Musicae.
- Tokuyama Tamaki (1939). 徳山タマキ 随筆集 [Essays]. Osaka: Kibunkan.

== Filmography ==
He performed in almost 10 films.

== Opera performances ==
- February 28, 1932 Cavalleria rusticana, Alfio, a carter. (Hibiya Hall)
- December 17, 1934, and January 20, 1935. Hansel and Gretel, Father. (Banquet Hall, Imperial Hotel at Hibiya)
- March 24–26, 1935 at the Friday Concerts Carmen, bull fighter Escamillo. (Army Officers' Hall (Kudan Kaikan) at Kudanshita)
- August 2–16, 1935 Carmen, Escamillo. (Yūrakuza Hall)

== Footnotes ==
Notes
