= Tadaharu Nakano =

- Born: May 27, 1909; Ōzu, Ehime Prefecture, Japan
- Origin: Japan
- Died: February 19, 1970 (aged 60) Tokyo, Japan
- Genres: Jazz, Ryūkōka, Gunka
- Occupations: Singer, bandleader, composer
- Labels: Nippon Columbia, King Records

Tadaharu Nakano (中野忠晴, Nakano Tadaharu; May 27, 1909 – February 19, 1970) was a popular Japanese baritone singer of jazz and ryūkōka in Shōwa era Japan.

== Life and career ==
Nakano was born in Ōzu, Ehime on May 27, 1909. His interest in music was sparked in early childhood by the sound of the organ at a local Christian church where his father served as a pastor.

When he became older, he joined his congregation's choir where his interest in Western music grew. He later credited the experience as the greatest influence on his career as a jazz singer.

In 1929 he enrolled at the Musashino Academia Musicae and graduated from the school's vocal department in 1932. At his debut recital in the spring of that year, Nakano presented a program of selections from Kurt Weill's The Threepenny Opera, which had been premiered in Japan earlier that year.

Among the songs Nakano included in his program was Mack the Knife. He was discovered by the composer Kōsaku Yamada, who attended the concert on a scouting trip for Nippon Columbia. Soon afterwards he signed a contract with the label, who was marketed as a rival to fellow baritone and Musashino Academia Musicae alumni Tamaki Tokuyama on Nippon Victor Records.

Influenced by work of The Mills Brothers and The Comedian Harmonists, Nakano founded his own vocal group in 1934: the Columbia Nakano Rhythm Boys (コロムビア・ナカノ・リズム・ボーイズ, Coromubia Nakano Rizumu Boizu). A string of hits followed, beginning with their cover of Leslie Sarony's The Alpine Milkman (山の人氣者, Yama no ninkimono). Ryōichi Hattori later collaborated with Nakano and his group, producing some of the group's most memorable songs. One of their most controversial numbers was 1940's Shortage Song (タリナイ・ソング, Tarinai songu), which satirized the widespread shortages of food and materials in wartime Japan. The song's subsequent ban, as well as a general government crackdown on jazz music, resulted in the Rhythm Boys' breakup in 1941. Nakano went on to continue a solo career.

After the war, Nakano joined King Records, but quickly retired from singing citing a throat injury. Composition became the focus of the final part of his career, penning hit songs for Chiemi Eri, Utako Matsushima, Hachirō Kasuga, Michiya Mihashi and Ichirō Wakahara.

== Death ==
Nakano died February 19, 1970, from lung cancer, aged 60. He was buried at the Zōshigaya Cemetery.
