= Miyasan, Miyasan =

First known military song in Japan

Miyasan, Miyasan 宮さん宮さん
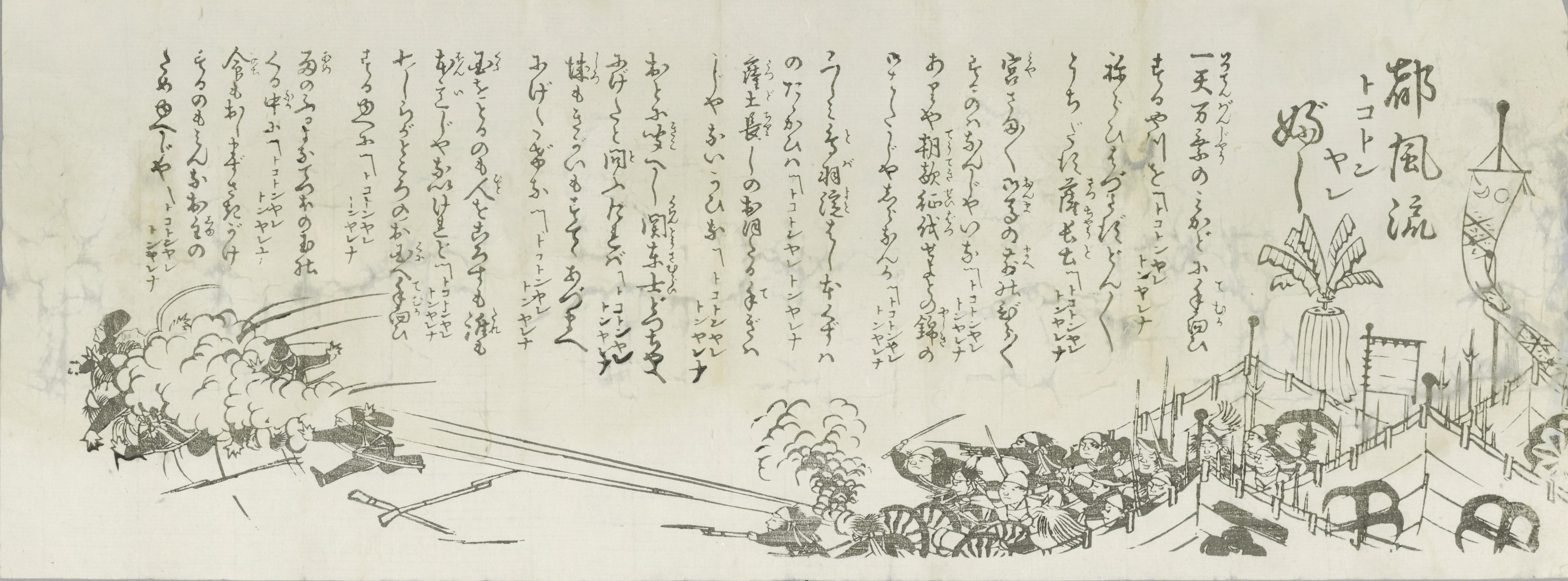
- The song's lyrics, c. 1868
- Lyrics: Shinagawa Yajirō, c. 1868
- Published: c. 1868

"Miyasan, Miyasan" (宮さん宮さん) (Note: The song is also known as the Tokoton'yare Bushi, or the Tonyare-Bushi.), was a loyalist song, popular during the Boshin War. It is also Japan's oldest extant military song.

== Overview ==
The lyrics refer to Prince Arisugawa Taruhito, or "Miya-san" in the song. He was an influential figure in the Meiji Restoration. He was also the Grand Governor of the Eastern Expedition during the war. The lyrics represent the spirits of the new government forces which was the military forces belonging to the emperor and the Imperial Court.

In January 1868, the new government forces, formed from the three domains of Satsuma, Choshu, and Tosa and the respective lords of each province, fought and won the Battle of Toba-Fushimi against the old shogunate forces. The following month, the new government's president, Prince Arisugawa Taruhito, also serving as the Grand Governor-General of the Eastern Expedition, was given a brocaded flag and a ceremonial sword by Emperor Meiji, and began marching along the Tokaido Highway. All these events are mentioned in the songs lyrics.

A version of the melody, renamed "Mi-ya Sa-ma", is used in the comic opera The Mikado (1885) by Gilbert and Sullivan.

== Lyrics ==
The lyrics are given in Japanese, next to a transliteration and an English translation. Sources:

Japanese

宮さん宮さんお馬の前に
ヒラヒラするのは何じゃいな
トコトンヤレ、トンヤレナ

あれは朝敵征伐せよとの
錦の御旗じゃ知らないか
トコトンヤレ、トンヤレナ

一天萬乗の一天萬乗の
帝王に手向かいする奴を
トコトンヤレ、トンヤレナ

狙い外さず狙い外さず
どんどん撃ち出す薩長土
トコトンヤレ、トンヤレナ

伏見、鳥羽、淀、橋本、
葛葉の戰は
トコトンヤレ、トンヤレナ

薩土長肥の 薩土長肥の
合うたる手際じゃないかいな
トコトンヤレ、トンヤレナ

音に聞えし関東武士
どっちへ逃げたと問うたれば
トコトンヤレ、トンヤレナ

城も気概も城も気概も
捨てて吾妻へ逃げたげな
トコトンヤレ、トンヤレナ

國を迫うのも人を殺すも
誰も本気じゃないけれど
トコトンヤレ、トンヤレナ

薩長土肥の薩長土肥の
先手に手向いする故に
トコトンヤレ、トンヤレナ

雨の降るよな鐵砲の玉の
鐵砲の玉の来る中に
トコトンヤレ、トンヤレナ

命惜まず魁するのも
皆お主の為め故じゃ
トコトンヤレ、トンヤレナ

Transliteration into rōmaji

Miya san miya san o uma no mae ni
Hirahira suru no wa nan jai na
Tokoton'yare ton'yarena

Are wa chōteki seibatsuseyo to no
Nishiki no mihata ja shiranai ka
Tokoton'yare ton'yarena

Itten banjō no itten banjō no
Mikado ni temukai suru yatsu o
Tokoton'yare ton'yarena

Nerai hazusazu nerai hazusazu
Dondon uchidasu satchōdo
Tokoton'yare ton'yarena

Fushimi, Toba, Yodo, Hashimoto
Kuzuha no tatakai wa
Tokoton'yare ton'yarena

Satchōdōhi no satchōdōhi no
Ōtaru tegiwa janai kai na
Tokoton'yare ton'yarena

Oto ni kikoe shi Kantō samurai
Dotchi e nigeta to tou tareba
Tokoton'yare ton'yarena

Shiro mo kigai mo shiro mo kigai mo
Sutete azuma e nigetage na
Tokoton'yare ton'yarena

Kuni o ou no mo hito o korosu mo
Dare mo honki ja nai keredo
Tokoton'yare ton'yarena

Satchōdōhi no satchōdōhi no
Sakite ni temukai suru yueni
Tokoton'yare ton'yarena

Ame no furu yo na senhou no tama no
Senhou no tama no kuru naka ni
Tokoton'yare ton'yarena

Inochi oshimazu sakigake suru no mo
Mina oshu no tame yue ja
Tokoton'yare ton'yarena

English translation

My Lord, My Lord, what is that
Fluttering in front of your horse?
Go all the way, all the way.

That is the brocade flag which says,
Defeat our Imperial Enemy, don't you know?
Go all the way, all the way.

Against the enemy who opposes
The Emperor of the whole realm
Go all the way, all the way.

Warriors of Satsuma, Chōshū, Tosa
Fire away with unerring aim
Go all the way, all the way.

Fushimi, Toba, Yodo, Hashimoto
And Kuzuha are our victories
Go all the way, all the way.

Is that not due to
the Satchōdōhi's perfect technique?
Go all the way, all the way.

The well known Kanto samurai
When asked which way they ran
Go all the way, all the way.

They abandoned their castle and spirit
Then fled to the east. (Note: i.e. "to the east": After the Fall of Osaka Castle, Tokugawa Yoshinobu fled east to Edo.)
Go all the way, all the way.

Thinking of our nation, killing the people
No one wished for this, however
Go all the way, all the way

Satsuma, Choshu, Tosa, and Hizen
They took the initiative to oppose the advance party
Go all the way, all the way.

In the middle of gunfire
As the rain falls down
Go all the way, all the way.

Risk your life and lead the charge
All for the sake of everyone
Go all the way, all the way.

== External link ==
- "Miyasan, Miyasan", YouTube
  - Choral version, YouTube
