= Dōki no Sakura =

Japanese WWII military song

"Dōki no Sakura" (同期の桜; Synchronized cherry blossoms) is a Japanese gunka (composition of military music) During the late stages of the Pacific War, it was sung throughout Japan. It compares cherry blossoms with the destiny of soldiers who graduated from a military academy. The song was composed by Nōshō Ōmura. Although Yaso Saijō was thought to have written the original lyrics, he did not write the lyrics directly.

Originally released as "Sen'yū no Uta" (戦友の唄; Song of comrades) in 1939, the third and fourth verses were not added along with the original first, second and fifth verses until around 1944. In the revised version, the story of two kamikaze pilots was established. In the song, although a pilot dies, his bond with another surviving pilot remains strong. Before their mission, kamikaze pilots would sing "Dōki no Sakura" together.

== Lyrics ==
Kanji	Rōmaji	English
貴様と俺とは 同期の桜 同じ兵学校の 庭に咲く 咲いた花なら 散るのは覚悟 みごと散りましょ 国のため	Kisama to ore to wa dōki no sakura Onaji heigakkō no niwa ni saku Saita hana nara chiru no wa kakugo Migoto chirimashō kuni no tame	You and I are cherry blossoms We bloom in the same military school We have the destiny to fall We shall fall for our country
貴様と俺とは 同期の桜 同じ兵学校の 庭に咲く 血肉分けたる 仲ではないが なぜか気が合うて 別れられぬ	Kisama to ore to wa dōki no sakura Onaji heigakkō no niwa ni saku Chiniku waketaru naka dewa nai ga Nazeka ki ga ōte wakarerarenu	You and I are cherry blossoms We bloom in the same military school Though we are not brothers biologically But we get along that no one could separate us apart
貴様と俺とは 同期の桜 同じ航空隊の 庭に咲く 仰いだ夕焼け 南の空に 未だ還らぬ 一番機	Kisama to ore to wa dōki no sakura Onaji kokūtai no niwa ni saku Aoida yūyake minami no sora ni Imada kaeranu ichibanki	You and I are cherry blossoms We bloom in the same air force group Looking up into the sunlight of the Southern skies Waited to the flight leader to be in vain
貴様と俺とは 同期の桜 同じ航空隊の 庭に咲く あれほど誓った その日も待たず なぜに死んだか 散ったのか	Kisama to ore to wa dōki no sakura Onaji kokūtai no niwa ni saku Are hodo chikatta sono hi mo matazu Nazeni shinda ka chitta noka	You and I are cherry blossoms We bloom in the same air force group For our solemn vows, we die together Therefore, why fall and perish ahead?
貴様と俺とは 同期の桜 離れ離れに 散ろうとも 花の都の 靖国神社 春の梢に 咲いて会おう	Kisama to ore towa dōki no sakura Hanarebanare ni chirō to mo Hana no miyako no Yasukuni jinja Haru no kozue ni saite aō	You and I are cherry blossoms We should fall at different places and timing We should meet at the Yasukuni Shrine, in the capital of glory! We would meet again on spring on some cherry branch
