= Roei no Uta =

1938 Japanese gunka song

Single by Tadaharu Nakano, Akira Matsudaira, Noboru Kirishima, Hisao Itō, Akira Sasaki
- Language: Japanese
- English title: Song of the Camp
- A-side: "Shingun no Uta"
- Released: October 1938
- Genre: Gunka
- Label: Nippon Columbia
- Composer: Yūji Koseki
- Lyricist: Kīchirō Yabūchi

Roei no Uta (露営の歌; Song of the Camp) is a Japanese gunka song composed by Yūji Koseki with lyrics by Kīchirō Yabūchi. The song was released by Nippon Columbia in October 1938.

== History ==
In the wake of the outbreak of the Second Sino-Japanese War in July 1937, demand for patriotic songs to boost public and military morale swelled in Japan. Newspapers regularly held competitions calling for submissions from the public of songs and song lyrics. The lyrics for Roei no Uta were chosen in such a fashion, after a contest jointly held by the Tokyo Nichi Nichi Shimbun and Osaka Mainichi Shimbun. The jury, which included the writer Kan Kikuchi and the poet Hakushū Kitahara, awarded Kīchirō Yabūchi's Roei no Uta as the winning entry. The 28-year-old composer Yūji Koseki was chosen to set the lyrics to music.

Nippon Columbia recorded the song soon after with singers Tadaharu Nakano, Akira Matsudaira, Noboru Kirishima, Hisao Itō, and Akira Sasaki performing, backed by the Nippon Columbia house orchestra under the direction of the composer. The song, originally the B-side to the Shingun no Uta (進軍の歌; Song of the Advance) which was performed by the Toyama Military Academy's band and male chorus, quickly eclipsed its discmate in popularity, eventually selling in excess of 600,000 copies.

The song became one of the most famous gunka in Japan, establishing Yūji Koseki at the forefront of Japanese composers of the era.

== Lyrics ==
Japanese

勝って来るぞと 勇ましく
ちかって故郷を 出たからは
手柄たてずに 死なりょうか
進軍ラッパ 聴くたびに
瞼に浮かぶ 旗の波

土も草木も 火と燃える
果てなき曠野 踏みわけて
進む日の丸 鉄兜
馬のたてがみ なでながら
明日の命を 誰が知る

弾丸もタンクも 銃剣も
しばし露営の 草まくら
夢に出てきた 父上に
死んで還れと 励まされ
醒めて睨むは 敵の空

思えば今日の 戦闘に
朱に染まって にっこりと
笑って死んだ 戦友が
天皇陛下 万歳と
残した声が 忘らりょか

戦する身は かねてから
捨てる覚悟で いるものを
ないてくれるな 草の虫
東洋平和の ためならば
なんの命が 惜しかろか

Japanese (Romanised)

Katte kuru zo to isamashiku
Chika tte furusato o detakara wa
Tegara tatezu ni shina ryō ka
Shingun rappa kiku tabi ni
Mabuta ni ukabu hata no nami

Tsuchi mo kusaki mo hi to moeru
Hatenaki kōya fumi wakete
Susumu hinomaru tetsukabuto
Uma no tategami nadenagara
Ashita no inochi o dare ga shiru

Dangan mo tanku mo jūken mo
Shibashi roei no kusa makura
Yume ni detekita chichiue ni
Shinde kaere to hagemasa re
Samete niramu wa teki no sora

Omoeba kyō no sentō ni
Shu ni somatte nikkori to
Emi tte shinda sen'yū ga
Ten'nōheika banzai to
Nokoshita koe ga wasureru yoka

Sen suru mi wa kanetekara
Suteru kakugo de iru mono o
Naite kureru na kusa no mushi
Tōyō heiwa no tamenaraba
Nan no inochi ga oshikaro ka
