= Isao Hayashi =

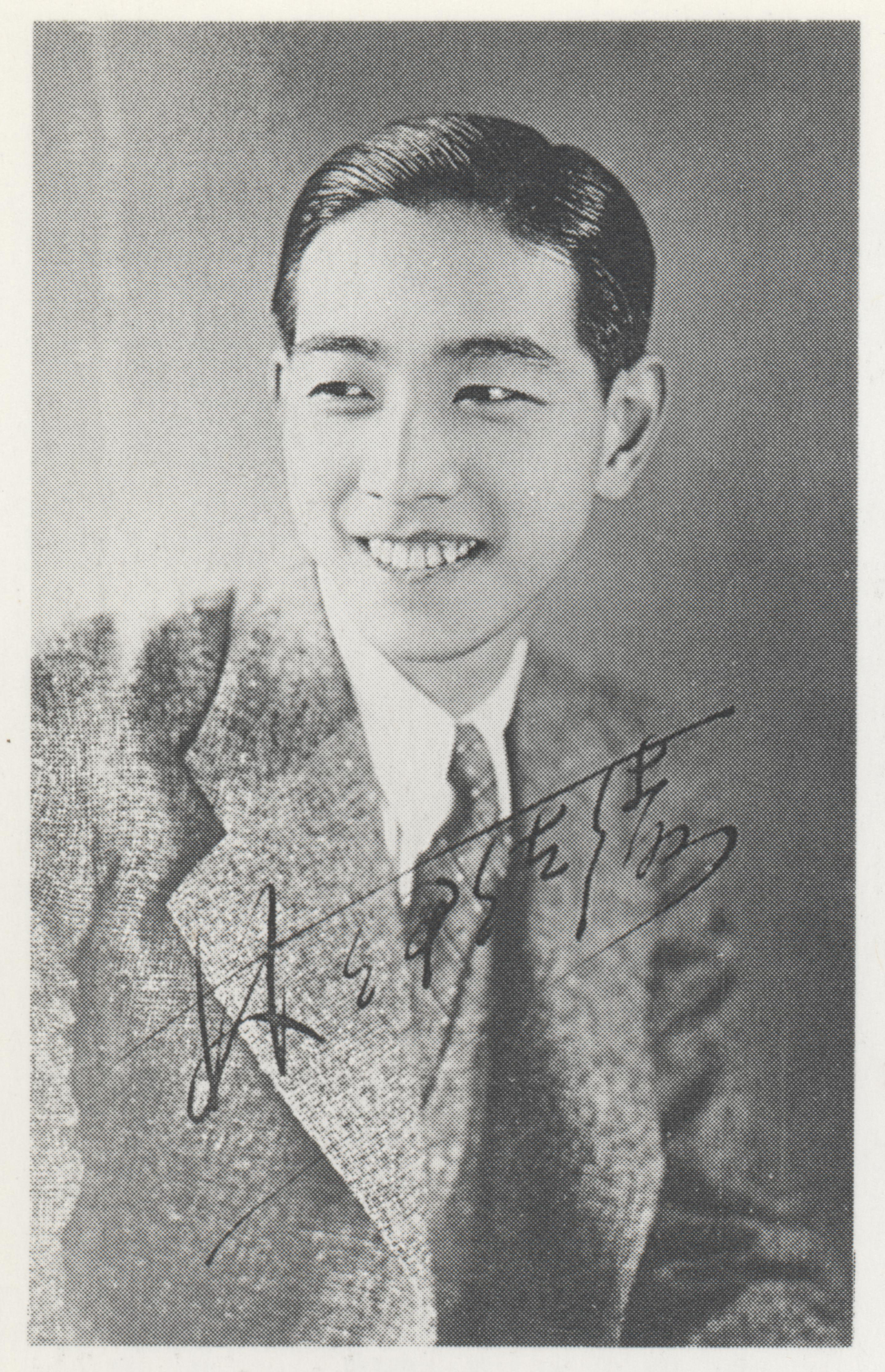

Background information
- Born: Isao Hayashi; May 11, 1912; Shimonoseki, Yamaguchi Prefecture, Japan
- Died: September 29, 1995 (aged 83)
- Genres: Ryūkōka, Gunka
- Occupations: Singer, composer
- Years active: 1931—1995

Isao Hayashi (林伊佐緒, Hayashi Isao; May 11, 1912 – September 29, 1995) was a Japanese popular music and military music singer and composer. He took part in the Japan's famous year-end show Kōhaku Uta Gassen eleven times. One of the well-known songs composed by him is the military song "Shussei Heishi o Okuru Uta" (出征兵士を送る歌; "Song for Giving Warriors a Send-off").

== Biography ==
Hayashi was born in Shimonoseki, Yamaguchi Prefecture, Japan. In 1931, he debuted with song "Tabi no Yado" (旅の宿; "Hotel For Trip"). He signed with the King Records label in 1936.

Hayashi also composed Hachiro Kasuga's "Nagasaki no Onna" and Michiya Mihashi's "Ringo Mura Kara".

Hayashi served as the leader of the Japan Singers Association from 1989 to 1995.

== Discography ==
- "Moshimo Gekyu ga Agattara" (若しも月給があがったら, Moshimo Gekyu ga Agattara; "If my salary has risen") : 1937
- "Shussei Heishi o Okuru Uta" (出征兵士を送る歌; "Song for Giving Warriors a Send-off") : 1939
- "Dance Party no Yoru" (ダンスパーティーの夜, Dansu Pātī no Yoru; "Dance Party's Night") : 1950
- "Mamurogawa Bugi" (真室川ブギ; "Mamurogawa Boogie-woogie") : 1954
- "Kōgen no Yado" (高原の宿; "Tableland Hotel") : 1955
