= Fujin Jūgunka =

"Fujin Jūgunka" (婦人従軍歌; Women's Service Song) is a Japanese gunka published in 1894 during the First Sino-Japanese War. The song was composed by Oku Yoshiisa and the lyrics were written by Katō Yoshikiyo. The first verse, along with that of "Sen'yū", was used in the interlude of Hachirō Konoe's song, "Aa Waga Sen'yū".

During the war, the Japanese Red Cross Society sent trained women nurses to military hospitals at Ujina in Hiroshima. Women participation in the war as nurses gained international attention, and "Fujin Jūgunka," which was published at the time, was widely sung throughout the late Meiji period. During the Russo-Japanese War, activity for women nurses extended to Manchuria and Korea, and there have been casualties.
