= Shussei Heishi o Okuru Uta =

"Shussei Heishi wo Okuru Uta"

Song
- Language: Japanese
- English title: Song for Giving Warriors a Send-off
- Released: October 1939
- Length: 3:18
- Label: King
- Composer: Isao Hayashi
- Lyricist: Daisaburō Ikuta

"Shussei Heishi o Okuru Uta" (出征兵士を送る歌; Song for Giving Warriors a Send-off) is a Japanese gunka song composed by Isao Hayashi with lyrics by Daisaburō Ikuta. It was released by King Records in October 1939.

== History ==
An accompanying music video was released in 1940. Recently, this song has been broadcast by sound trucks in Japan owned by uyoku dantai.

== Lyrics ==
Japanese

わが大君に 召されたる
生命光栄(はえ)ある 朝ぼらけ
讃えて送る 一億の
歓呼は高く 天を衝く
いざ征(ゆ)け つわもの
日本男児!

華と咲く身の 感激を
戎衣(じゅうい)の胸に 引き緊めて
正義の軍(いくさ) 征くところ
たれか阻(はば)まん その歩武(ほぶ)を
いざ征け つわもの
日本男児!

かがやく御旗(みはた) 先立て
越ゆる勝利の 幾山河
無敵日本の 武勲(いさおし)を
世界に示す ときぞ今
いざ征け つわもの
日本男児!

守る銃後に 憂なし
大和魂 ゆるぎなき
國のかために 人の和に
大磐石(だいばんじゃく)の この備え
いざ征け つわもの
日本男児!

ああ万世の 大君に
水漬(みず)き草むす 忠烈の
誓致さん 秋至(ときいた)る
勇ましいかな この首途(かどで)
いざ征け つわもの
日本男児!

父祖の血汐に 色映ゆる
国の誉れの 日の丸を
世紀の空に 燦然と
揚げて築けや 新亞細亞
いざ征け つわもの
日本男児!

Transliteration into rōmaji

Waga ōkimi ni mesare taru
Seiinochi hae aru asaborake
Tataete okuru ichi oku no
Kanko wa takaku ten o tsuku
Iza yuke tsuwamono
Nippon danji!

Hana to saku mi no kangeki o
Jūi no mune ni hiki chijimete
Seigi no ikusa utsuku tokoro
Tareka habaman sono hobu o
Iza yuke tsuwamono
Nippon danji!

Kagayaku mihata sakidate
Koyuru shōri no iku sanga
Muteki Nippon no isaoshi o
Sekai ni shimesu toki zo ima
Iza yuke tsuwamono
Nippon danji!

Mamoru jūgo ni ureinashi
Yamatodamashii yurugi naki
Kuni no katame ni hito no wa ni
Daibanjaku no kono sonae
Iza yuke tsuwamono
Nippon danji!

Ā bansei no ōkimi ni
Mizu ki kusa musu chūretsu no
Chikai itasan tokiitaru
Isamashii ka a kono kadode
Iza yuke tsuwamono
Nippon danji!

Fuso no chishio ni iro hayuru
Kuni no homare no hinomaru o
Seiki no sora ni sanzen to
Agete kizuke ya shin Ajia
Iza yuke tsuwamono
Nippon danji!
