= Mikasa Park =

Park in Yokosuka, Japan

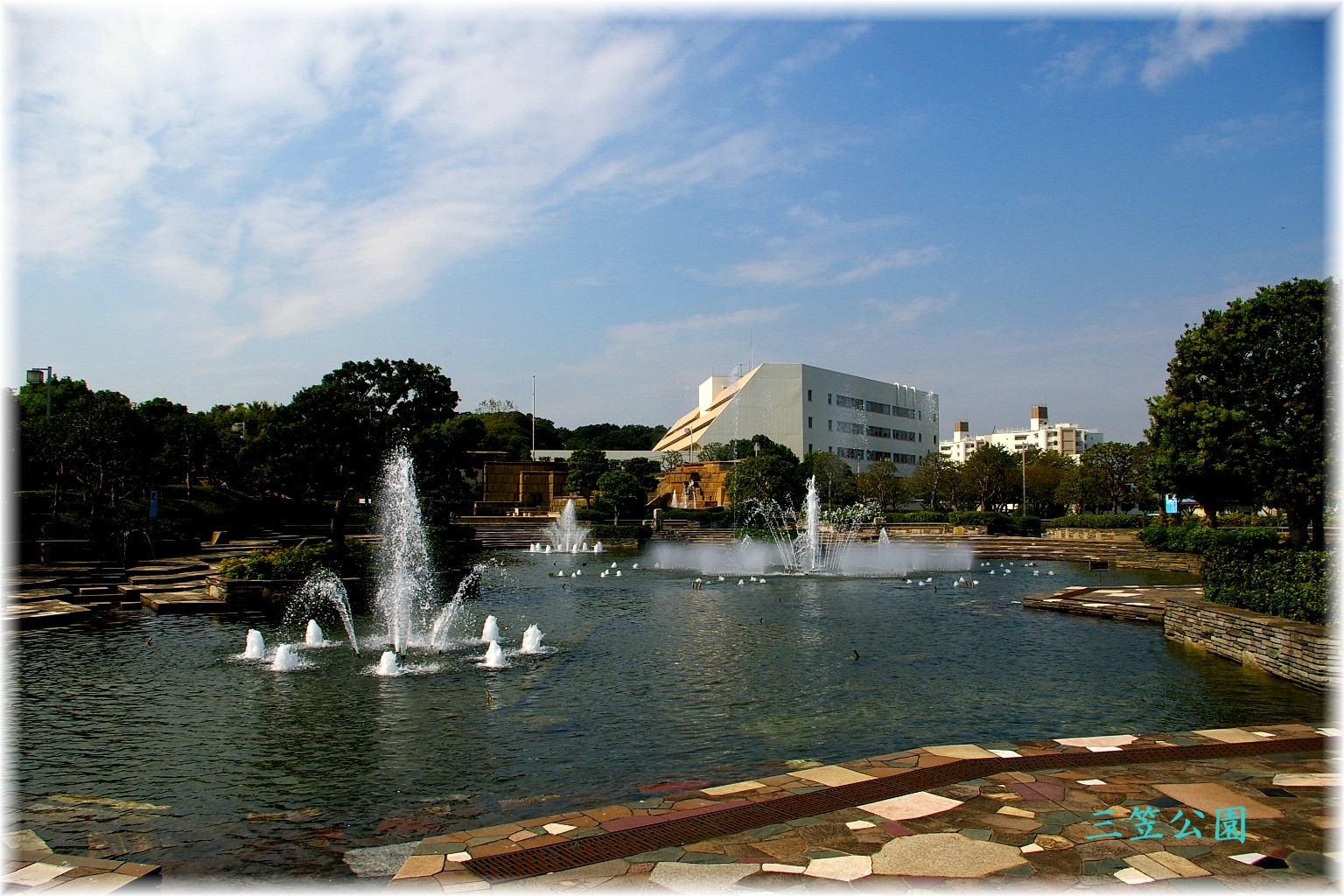
- The fountain at the park

- Location within Japan
- Coordinates: 35.2853°N 139.6740°E

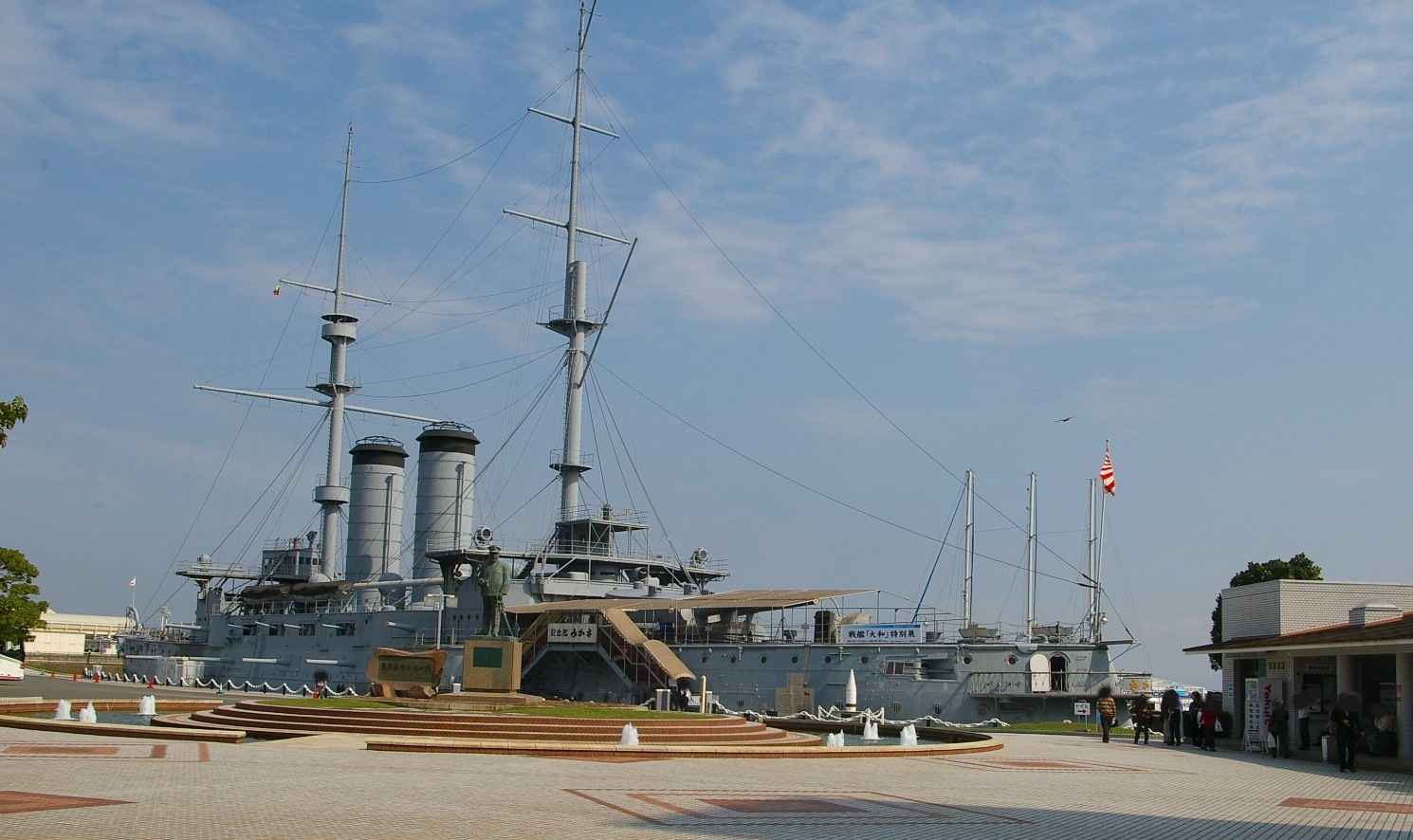
Battleship Mikasa

Mikasa Park (三笠公園, Mikasa Kōen) is a park located in Yokosuka, Kanagawa, Japan.

== History ==
The park is centered around the battleship Mikasa, which was commissioned in 1902, and went on to play a role in Japan's victory in the Russo-Japanese War. In 1924, the ship's commander, Togo Heihachiro, led a "Mikasa Preservation Association" to "cultivate the national spirit" by establishing the park. After the end of World War II, the ship was stripped for parts, and portions were converted to be used as an aquarium, until a successful restoration campaign in the 1960s.

== Features ==
In addition to the Mikasa, the park features a fountain complex with music and lighting and two peace arches. It also has ammo from the Battleship Yamato and a monument of the Gunkan kōshinkyoku navy march song.

The park is among Japan's Top 100 City Parks. Monkey Island (猿島, Saru-shima) can be seen from most locations in the park.

== Gallery ==
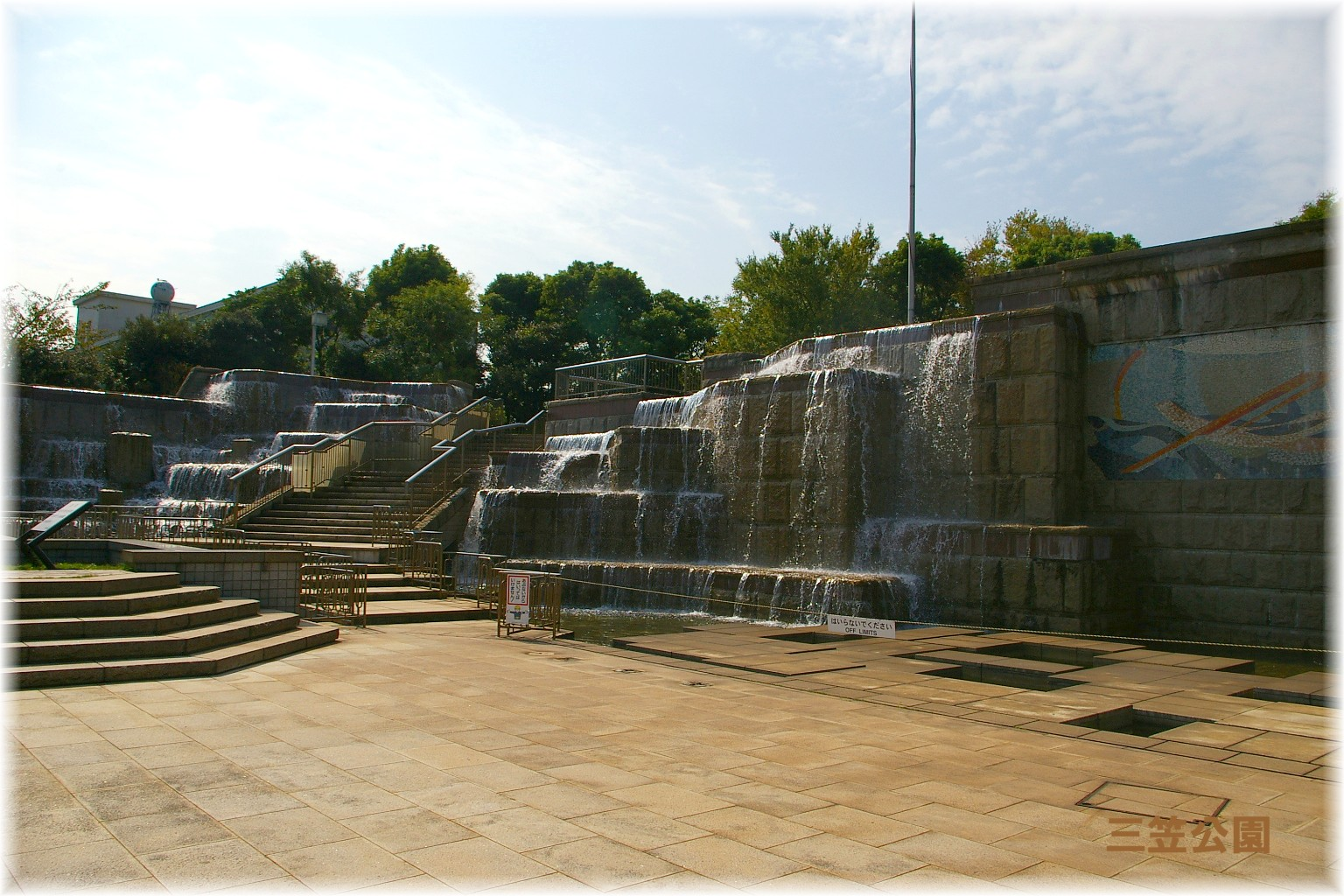
Fountain

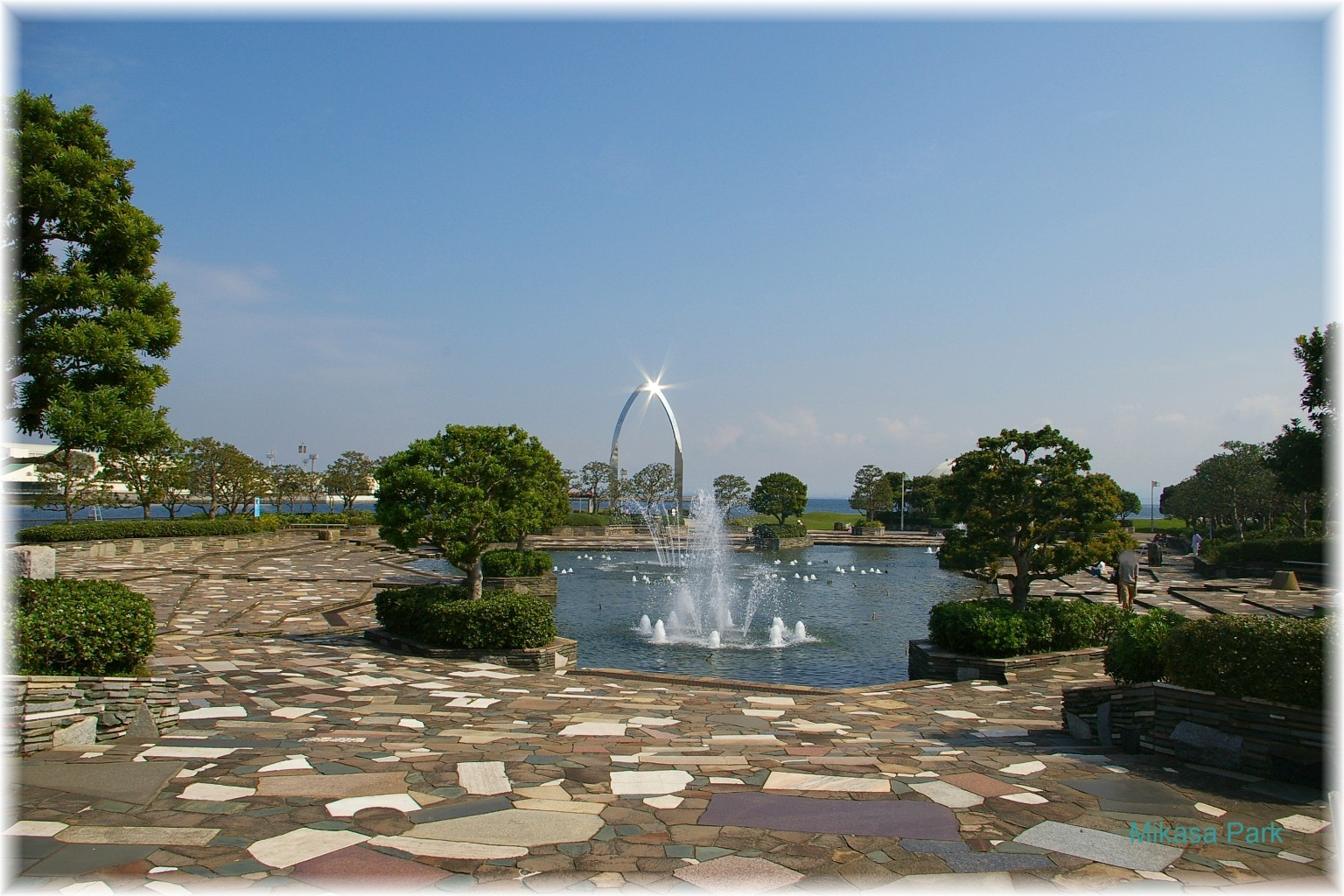
Fountain

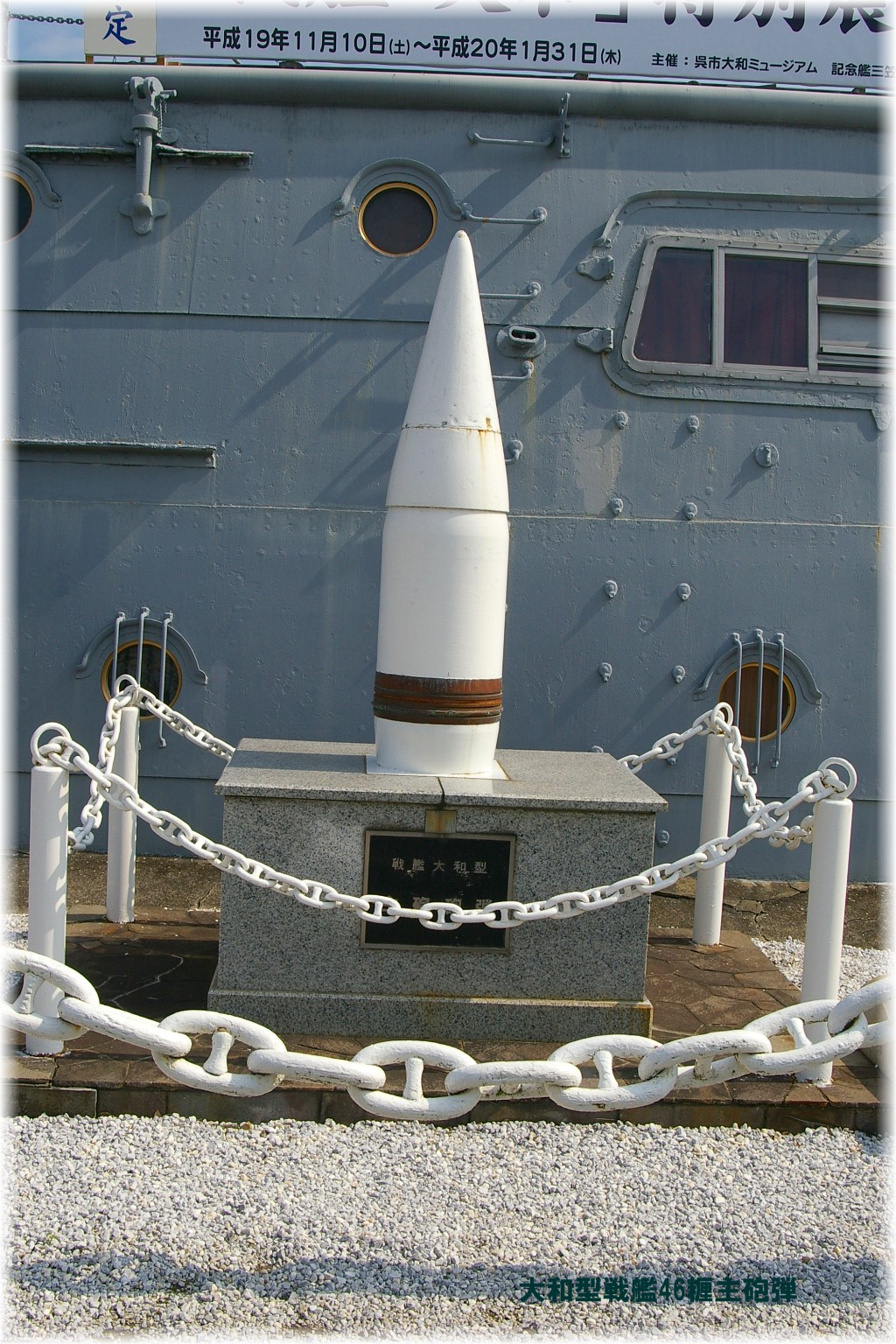
A shell from the Battleship Yamato

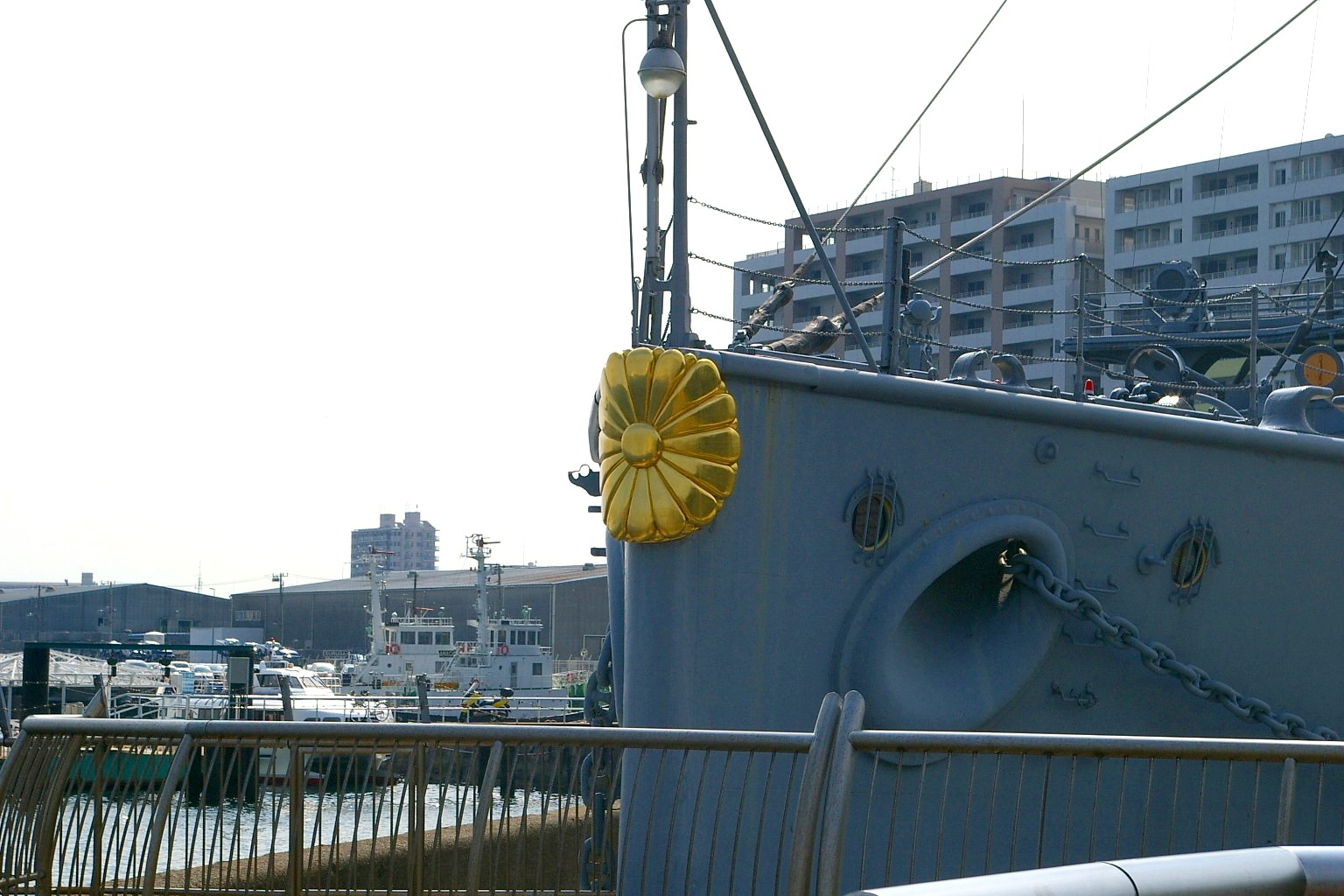
Bow of the Battleship Mikasa

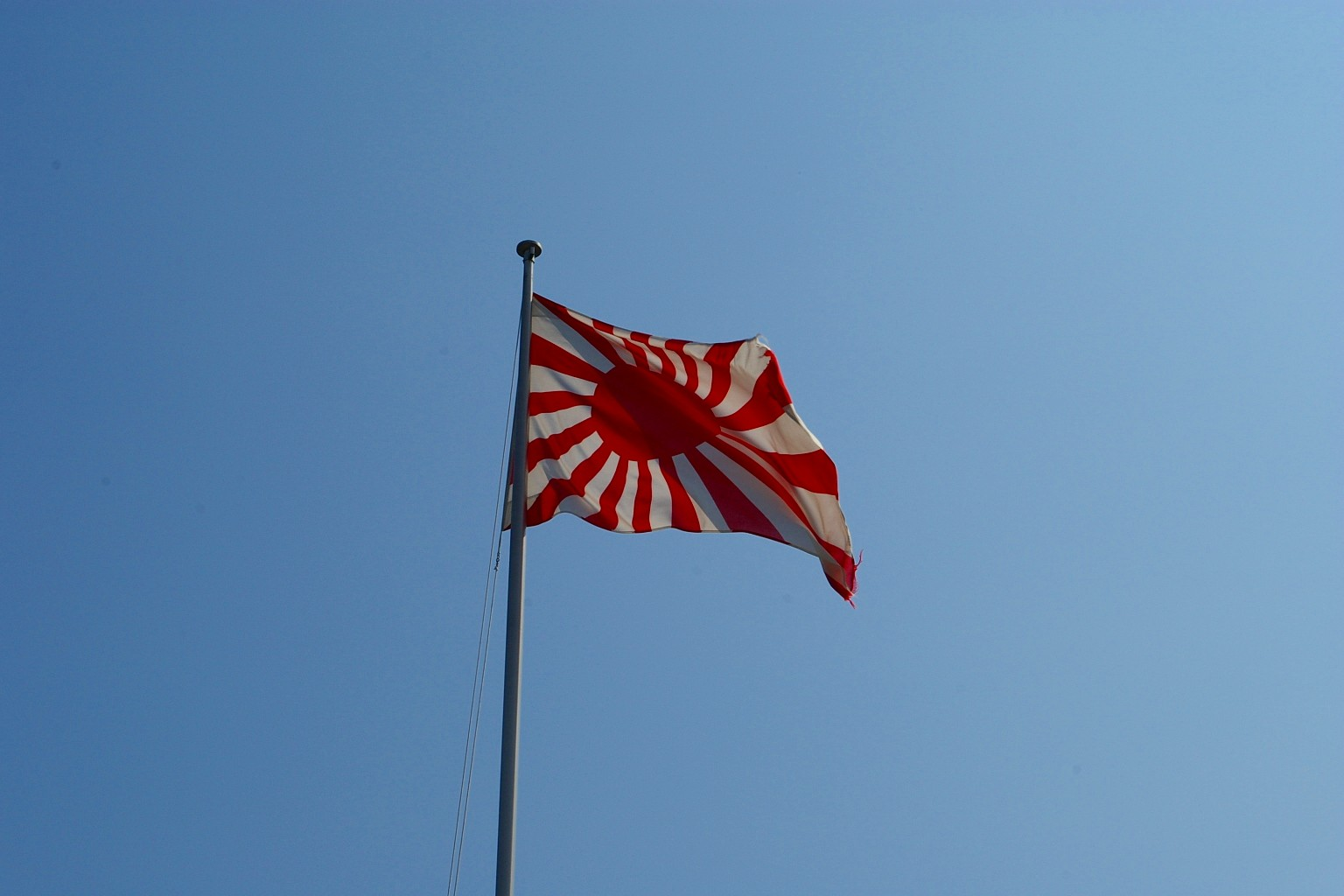
Naval Ensign of the Battleship Mikasa

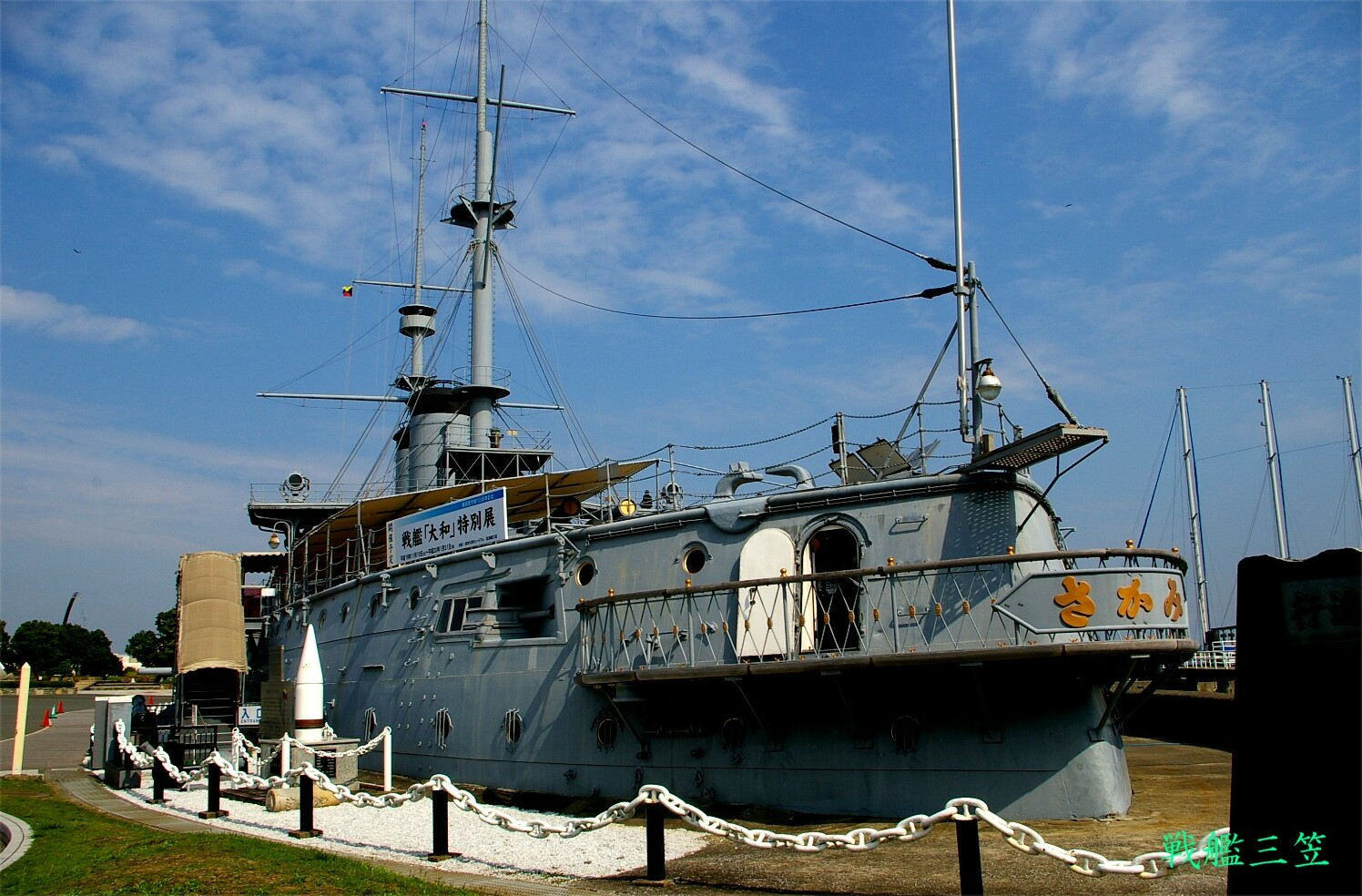
Back of the Battleship Mikasa
