= Tokichi Setoguchi =

Japanese composer (1868-1941)

- 瀬戸口藤吉
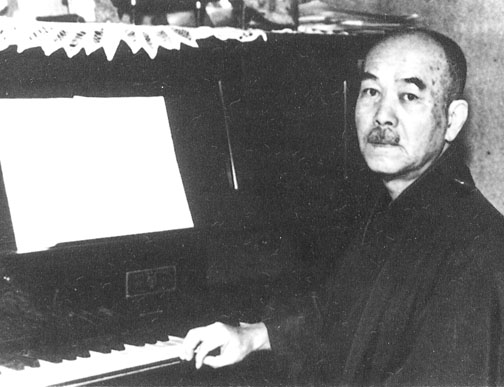
- Born: 28 June 1868; Kagoshima Prefecture, Japan
- Died: 8 November 1941 (aged 73); Azabu, Tokyo, Japan
- Occupations: Composer, music educator, conductor, clarinetist
- Notable work: Warship March; Aikoku Kōshinkyoku

Tokichi Setoguchi (瀬戸口藤吉, Setoguchi Tōkichi; 28 June 1868 – 8 November 1941) was a Japanese composer, music educator, conductor and clarinetist.

== Biography ==
Setoguchi was born on 28 June 1868, in Kagoshima Prefecture, Japan, in what is now the city of Tarumizu. In 1882, Setoguchi enlisted as a clarinetist in the military band of the Imperial Japanese Navy in Yokosuka. Later, he became an orchestra conductor. During a concert tour in 1907 through 16 European countries, he enjoyed great success, and became known as the Japanese Sousa. In 1910 he accompanied Prince Yoshihito on his journey to London for the coronation celebrations of King George V of the United Kingdom. He retired in 1917.

After his active service he was a professor of music at various universities and music conservatories.

He died in Azabu, Tokyo on 8 November 1941 of a cerebral hemorrhage.

As a composer he wrote a number of songs and military marches. In addition, he reformed Japanese military music between World War I and World War II.

== Compositions ==
=== Works for wind orchestra (military band) ===
- 1897: Warship March (also: "Gunkan March"), based on the song “Warship (Gunkan)" - text: Hiraku Toriyama. Official march of the Imperial Japanese Navy and of its successor, the present-day Japan Maritime Self-Defense Force.
- 1914: Nipponkai Kaisen
- 1941: Mamore Taiheiyo
- Battle of the Yellow Sea - text: Takeki Owada
- Flag of the Naval Ensign - text: Takeki Owada
- Gakushuin 50th Anniversary Song
- Harbor
- Hiroshi Kusunoki (Our Exile)
- Night Battle of the Tsushima Sea - text: Takeki Owada
- Obstruction Corps - text: Takeki Owada
- Qingdao Occupation Songs
- Sixth Submarine Lost - text: Takeki Owada
- Song of the Shikishima Warship (also: Warship -Shikishima- March) - text: Masaomi Ban
- South Manchuria Song
- Spring Dance
- The Athletics Grand March
- The Battle Of Tsushima Sea March - text: Takeki Owada
- The Man of War March
- 1937: The Patriotic March (Aikoku Koshinkyoku) - (together with: Ushimatsu Saito) - text: Yukio Morikawa
- The War of Mongolian Invasion
- Tokyo Tokyo ode march
- Watch Out, march
- Women's Patriotic Song
- Working Vessels - text: Takeki Owada and Nobutsuna Sasaki

== Bibliography ==
- Hitoshi Matsushita: A checklist of published instrumental music by Japanese composers, Tokyo: Academia Music Ltd., 1989, 181 p., ISBN 978-4-870-17039-1
- Masazirou Tanimura: "Warship, the 100-year march wake", Omura Bookstore, 2000, ISBN 4-7563-3012-6
- Paul E. Bierley, William H. Rehrig: The heritage encyclopedia of band music: composers and their music, Westerville, Ohio: Integrity Press, 1991, ISBN 0-918048-08-7
