= Battōtai (song) =

1887 Japanese military song

Battōtai 抜刀隊
English: Drawn-Sword Regiment
- March of the Japan Ground Self-Defense Force (as the "Army March")
- Lyrics: Toyama Masakazu, 1882
- Music: Charles Leroux, 1887
- Published: 1887

Audio sample
- Recording made on August 8, 1939, by the Imperial Japanese Army Band conducted by Ōnuma Satoru. The B and C sections of the march use the "Battōtai" melody.: file; help

"Battōtai" (抜刀隊; lit. 'Drawn-Sword Regiment') is a Japanese gunka whose lyrics come from a poem written by Toyama Masakazu in 1882 and whose melody was composed by the bandmaster of the Imperial Japanese Army Band, Charles Leroux, in 1887. The song was based on the Battle of Tabaruzaka, and the poem that made up the lyrics was inspired by the 1854 English poem "The Charge of the Light Brigade". A variation of the song, titled "Army March," has served as the march of the Japan Ground Self-Defense Force (JGSDF) since 2007.

== Background ==
The song references the Battōtai, who fought in the Battle of Tabaruzaka during the 1877 Satsuma Rebellion. Due to supply problems and heavy rain, the Satsuma rebels were forced to engage with the Imperial Japanese Army (IJA) in hand-to-hand combat. The Satsuma rebels inflicted heavy casualties against Imperial forces, who were mostly conscripts with no experience in wielding swords. Lieutenant General Yamagata Aritomo selected and deployed men from the surrounding area who were proficient with swords. He named this unit the Battōtai, or "Drawn-Sword regiment."

== History ==
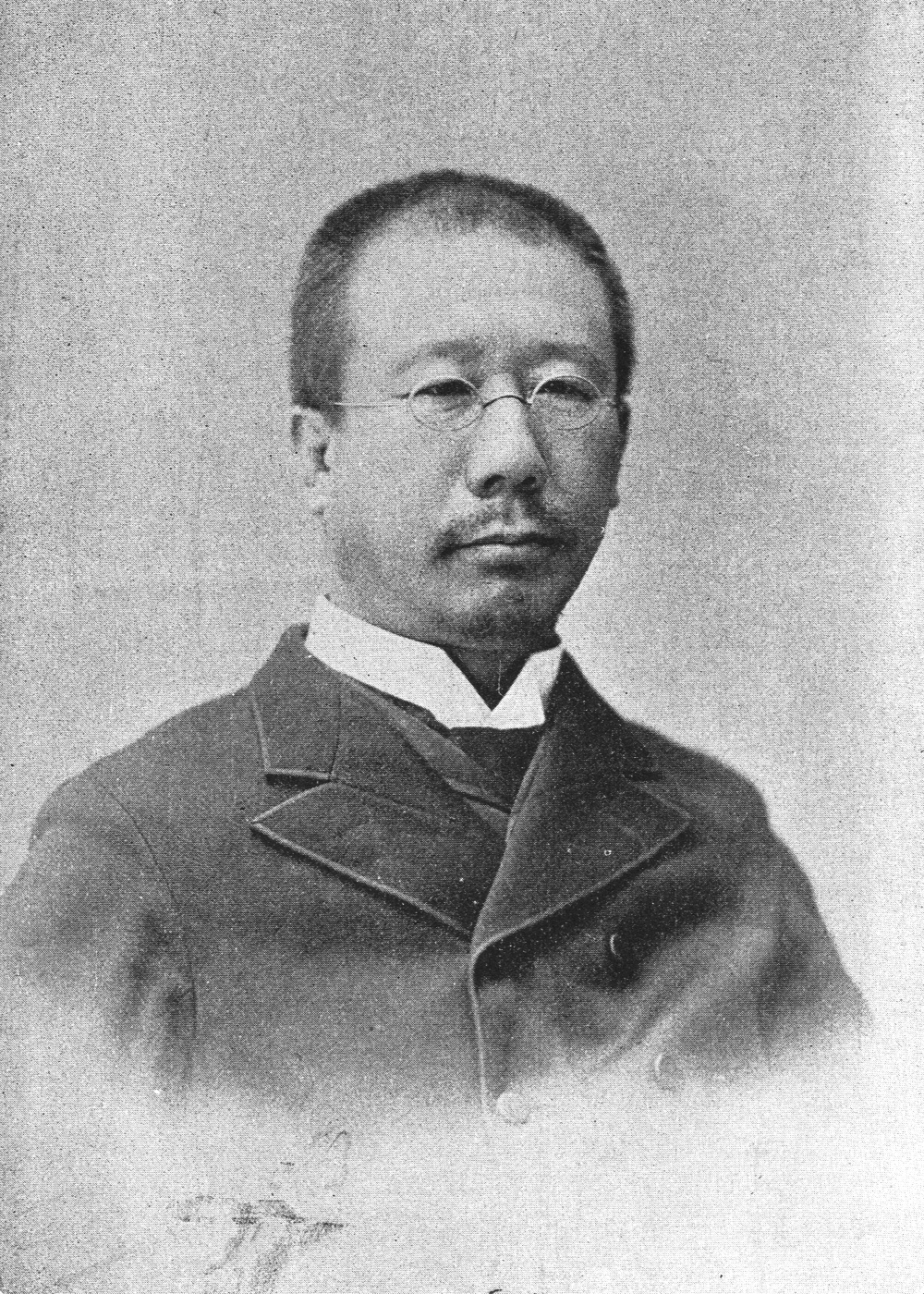
Toyama Masakazu, the poem's author

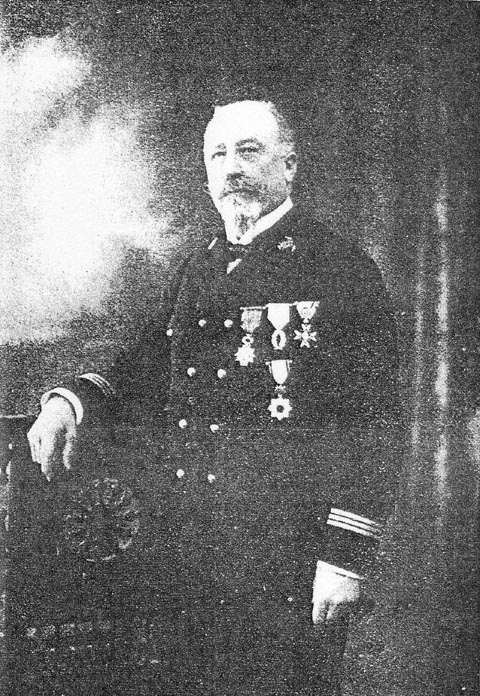
Charles Leroux, the song's composer

The song's lyrics were originally a poem written by Toyama Masakazu. Toyama had been inspired by the English poem "The Charge of the Light Brigade" by Alfred, Lord Tennyson, which he had translated. He published "Poem of the Battōtai" in book Selection of Poetry in the New Style (『新体詩抄』), published 1882. Despite the name of the book, Toyama's poem was written in the "old style". The poem gained immediate popularity amongst boys and young men. The genre of gunka, the Japanese term for military music, gives a favorable bias towards themes of death.

Charles Leroux, a French bandmaster and composer, arrived in Japan in 1876 as part of a French military advisory group. He composed a melody for "Battōtai" in 1887 that used both major and minor keys while he served as bandmaster of the Imperial Japanese Army Band.

"Battōtai" was first publicly performed the same year at a concert hosted by the Greater Japan Music Society at the Rokumeikan. It was considered the first Western-style military song in Japan and the first to become popular across the country, although it was initially believed to be difficult to sing for Japanese individuals unaccustomed to modulation.

=== Variations ===
==== Army March ====
Leroux took the tune of "Battōtai" and another one of his songs, "Fusōka", and created an arrangement called the "Army March". It was used as the official march of the IJA and was used to announce military successes during World War II. The march is still part of the repertoire of the military bands of the Japan Self-Defense Forces and the National Police Agency. It has been the march of the JGSDF since 2007.

==== Others ====
The song's tune was borrowed for a song titled "The Normanton Sinks Beneath the Waves", written after the English ship Normanton sank off the coast of Japan. The tune was also used for a wide variety of songs, including "The Voice of the Pines," "The Tsingtao Motif," "Naramaru's Chaos," "The Ancient Moon and Flower," and "First Comes Ichinomiya Shrine."

== Lyrics ==
Japanese

我は官軍我敵は
天地容れざる朝敵ぞ
敵の大將たる者は
古今無雙の英雄で

之に從ふ兵は
共に慓悍决死の士
鬼神に恥ぬ勇あるも
天の許さぬ叛逆を

起しゝ者は昔より
榮えし例あらざるぞ

敵の亡ぶる夫迄は
進めや進め諸共に
玉ちる劔拔き連れて
死ぬる覺悟で進むべし

皇國の風と武士の
其身を護る靈の
維新このかた廢れたる
日本刀の今更に

又世に出づる身の譽
敵も身方も諸共に
刃の下に死ぬべきぞ
大和魂ある者の

死ぬべき時は今なるぞ
人に後れて恥かくな

敵の亡ぶる夫迄は
進めや進め諸共に
玉ちる劔拔き連れて
死ぬる覺悟で進むべし

前を望めば劔なり
右も左りも皆劔
劔の山に登らんは
未來の事と聞きつるに

此世に於て目のあたり
劔の山に登るのも
我身のなせる罪業を
滅す爲にあらずして

賊を征討するが爲
劔の山もなんのその

敵の亡ぶるそれ迄は
進めや進め諸共に
玉ちる劔拔き連れて
死ぬる覺悟で進むべし

劔の光ひらめくは
雲間に見ゆる稻妻か
四方に打出す砲聲は
天に轟く雷（いかづち）か

敵の刃に伏す者や
丸に碎けて玉の緒の
絶えて墓なく失する身の
屍は積みて山をなし

其血は流れて川をなす
死地に入るのも君が爲

敵の亡ぶる夫迄は
進めや進め諸共に
玉ちる劔拔き連れて
死ぬる覺悟で進むべし

彈丸雨飛の間にも
二つなき身を惜まずに
進む我身は野嵐に
吹かれて消ゆる白露の

墓なき最期とぐるとも
忠義の爲に死ぬる身の
死（しに）て甲斐あるものならば
死ぬるも更に怨なし

我と思はん人たちは
一歩も後へ引くなかれ

敵の亡ぶる夫迄は
進めや進め諸共に
玉ちる劔拔き連れて
死ぬる覺悟で進むべし

我今茲（われいまここ）に死ん身は
君の爲なり國の爲
捨つべきものは命なり
假令（たと）ひ屍は朽ちぬとも

忠義の爲に捨る身の
名は芳しく後の世に
永く傳へて殘るらん
武士と生れた甲斐もなく

義もなき犬と云はるゝな
卑怯者となそしられそ

敵の亡ぶる夫迄は
進めや進め諸共に
玉ちる劔拔き連れて
死ぬる覺悟で進むべし

Transliteration into rōmaji

Ware wa kangun waga teki wa
Tenchi irezaru chouteki zo
Teki no taishou taru mono wa
Kokon musou no eiyuu de

Kore ni shitagou tsuwamono wa
Tomo ni hyoukan kesshi no shi
Kijin ni hajinu yuu aru mo
Ten no yurusanu hangyaku wo

Okoseshi mono wa mukashi yori
Sakaeshi tameshi arazaru zo

Teki no horoburu sore made wa
Susume ya susume morotomo ni
Tamachiru tsurugi nuki tsurete
Shinuru kakugo de susumu beshi

Mikuni no fuuto mononofu no
Sonomi wo mamoru tamashii no
Ishin kono kata sutaretaru
Yamato-gatana no ima sara ni

Mata yo ni izuru mi no homare
Teki mo mikata mo moro tomo ni
Yaiba no shita ni shinu beki zo
Yamato-damashii aru mono no

Shinubeki toki wa ima naru zo
Hito ni okurete haji kakuna

Teki no horoburu sore made wa
Susume ya susume morotomo ni
Tamachiru tsurugi nuki tsurete
Shinuru kakugo de susumu beshi

Mae wo nozomeba tsurugi nari
Migi mo hidari mo mina tsurugi
Tsurugi no yama ni noboran wa
Mirai no koto to kikitsuru ni

Kono yo ni oite manoatari
Tsurugi no yama ni noboru no mo
Waga mi no naseru zaigou wo
Horobosu tame ni arazushite

Zoku wo seibatsu suru ga tame
Tsurugi no yama mo nann' no sono

Teki no horoburu sore made wa
Susume ya susume morotomo ni
Tamachiru tsurugi nuki tsurete
Shinuru kakugo de susumu beshi

Tsurugi no hikari hirameku wa
Kumoma ni miyuru imazuma ka
Yomo ni uchidasu housei wa
Ten ni todoroku ikazuchi ka

Teki no yaiba ni fusumono ya
Tama ni kudakete tamanowo no
Taete hakanaku usuru mi no
Kabane wa tsumite yama wo nashi

Sono chi wa nagarete kawa wo nasu
Shichi ni iru nomo kimi ga tame

Teki no horoburu sore made wa
Susume ya susume morotomo ni
Tamachiru tsurugi nuki tsurete
Shinuru kakugo de susumu beshi

Dangan'uhi no aida nimo
Futatsu naki mi wo oshimazu ni
Susumu waga mi wa noarashi ni
Fukarete kiyuru shiratsuyu no

Hakanaki saigo wo togurutomo
Chugi no tame ni shinuru mi no
Shinite kai aru mono naraba
Shinurumo sarani uraminashi

Ware to omowan hitotachi wa
Ippo mo ato e hikunakare

Teki no horoburu sore made wa
Susume ya susume morotomo ni
Tamachiru tsurugi nuki tsurete
Shinuru kakugo de susumu beshi

Ware ima koko ni shinan mi wa
Kimi no tame nari kuni no tame
Sutsu beki mono wa inochi nari
Tatoi kabane wa kuchinu tomo

Chugi no tame ni sutsuru mi no
Na wa kanbashiku nochi no yo ni
Nagaku tsutaete nokoru ran
Bushi to umareta kai mo naku

Gi mo naki inu to iwaruruna
Hikyou mono to na soshirare so

Teki no horoburu sore made wa
Susume ya susume morotomo ni
Tamachiru tsurugi nuki tsurete
Shinuru kakugo de susumu beshi
