= Aa Kurenai no Chi wa Moyuru =

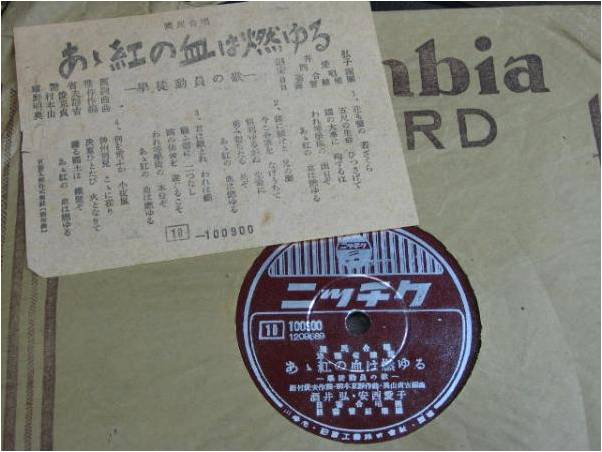

Song by Hiromu Sakai and Aiko Anzai
- Language: Japanese
- English title: Oh, crimson blood is burning
- Released: September 1944
- Label: Nippon Columbia
- Composer: Kyōsei Akemoto
- Lyricist: Toshio Nomura

"Aa Kurenai no Chi wa Moyuru" (あゝ紅の血は燃ゆる; Oh, crimson blood is burning) is a Japanese gunka released by Nippon Columbia in September 1944 during the Pacific War. In the song, the chorus repeats the phrase after every verse.

The lyrics for the song were written by Toshio Nomura, and the melody was composed by Kyōsei Akemoto with arrangements by Teikichi Okuyama. It was sung by Hiromu Sakai and Aiko Anzai. The song was subtitled "Gakuto Dōin no Uta" (学徒動員の歌; Song for student mobilisation).

In March 1944, the student labour mobilisation order was issued, and the former four month labour period was conducted throughout the year; this song was written for that purpose. For work orders directed at women, a song named "Kagayaku Kurokami" (輝く黒髪; Shining black hair) was written.

The national chorus aired this song through the broadcast choir on 26 June 1944.
