= Normanton incident =

1886 sinking of a British ship off Japan and resulting backlash

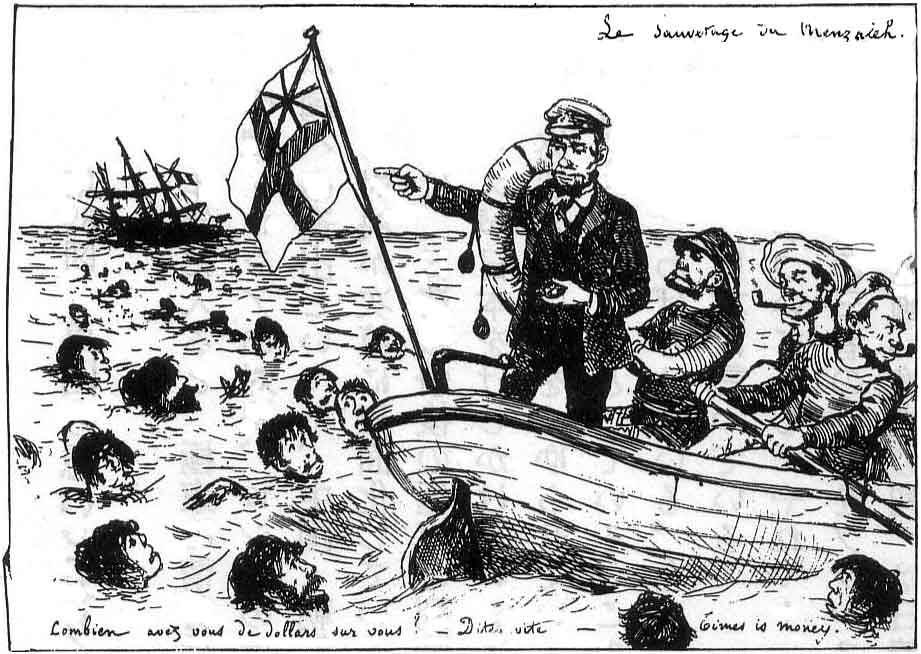
June 1887 cartoon by Georges Ferdinand Bigot on the incident. In the cartoon, Bigot compares the sinking of a French mail ship off Shanghai in 1887 to the conduct of Normanton's crew; Drake is depicted astride a lifeboat asking Japanese passengers drowning in the waves: "How much money do you have on you? Quick! Time is Money!"

The Normanton incident (ノルマントン号事件, Norumanton-gō jiken) was a series of events surrounding the sinking of the British merchantman Normanton of the coast of Japan's Wakayama Prefecture on 24 October 1886. Normanton, which had a mixed crew of Europeans and Asians along with 25 Japanese passengers onboard, was sailing from Yokohama to Kobe when it ran aground in bad weather and began sinking. The ship's British captain, John William Drake, escaped in Normanton's lifeboats along with his European crew members. None of the Asian crew or Japanese passengers survived the sinking, and three European sailors died of hypothermia while making their way back to the shore.

As under existing Anglo-Japanese treaties Drake and his crew were subject to extraterritoriality, they were tried by the British consular court in Kobe, which fully exonerated them of wrongdoing. Public uproar in Japan led to the case to be tried by the British Court for Japan, which found Drake guilty of criminal negligence and sentenced him to three months of imprisonment. The incident led to an increase in anti-British and anti-Western sentiment in Japan, along with an uptick in support among the Japanese public for the renegotiation of the unequal treaties, especially with regard to clauses in those treaties pertaining to extraterritoriality.

== Incident ==
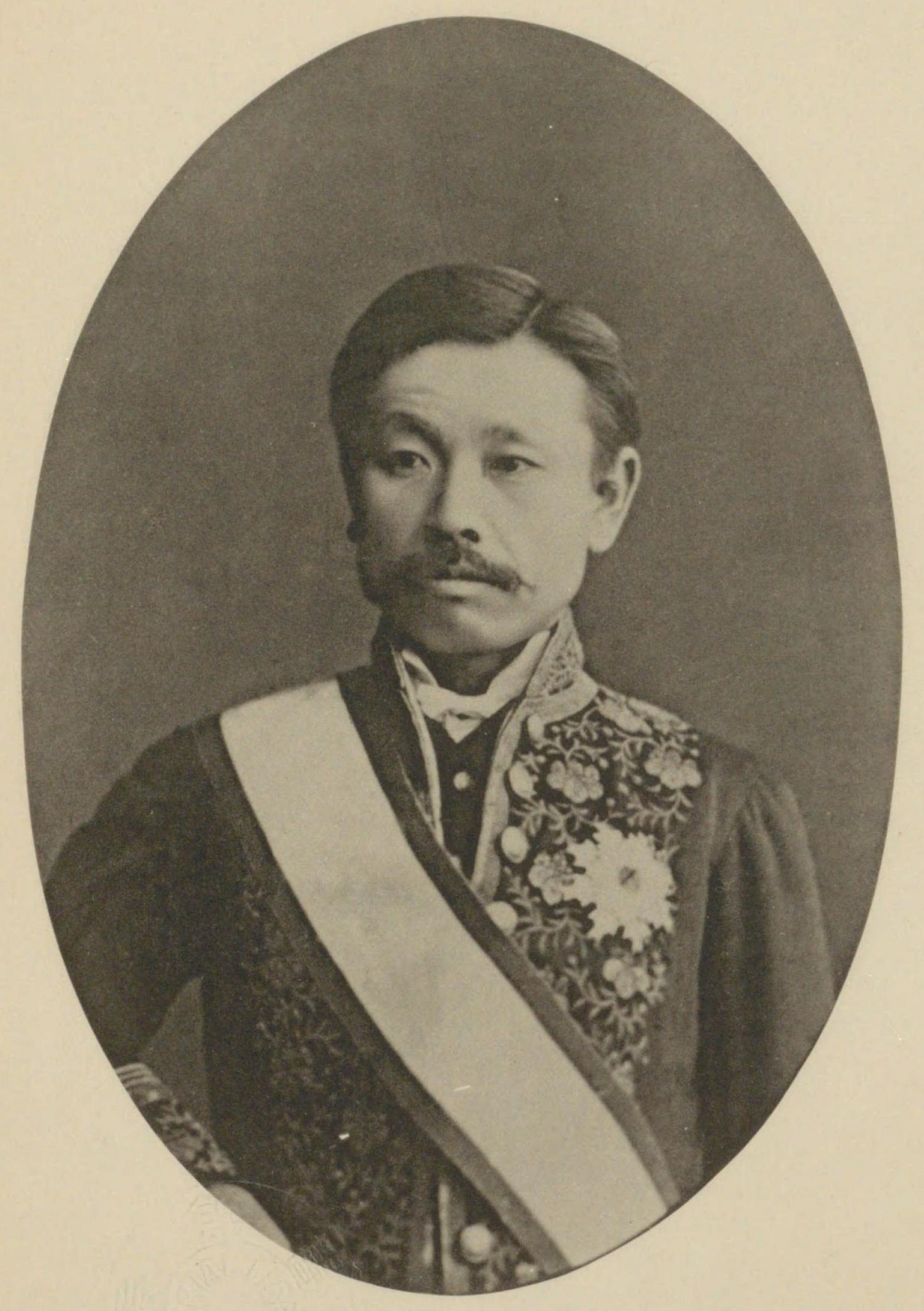
Inoue Kaoru, the first Japanese Minister for Foreign Affairs, in 1880

On the evening of 24 October 1886, the British merchantman Normanton, registered to the Madamson & Bell Steamship Company, left Yokohama laden with goods and 25 Japanese passengers for Kobe. En route, she was caught in heavy wind and rains all the way off Yokkaichi in Mie Prefecture to Kashinosaki in Wakayama Prefecture, where the vessel ran aground on an offshore reef and began sinking. The ship's captain, the Briton John William Drake, and all of his European sailors (consisting of a mixture of Britons and Germans) escaped the sinking ship in her lifeboats, leaving 12 Indian and Chinese sailors along with the Japanese passengers to escape by themselves. Drake and his crewmen were picked up by Japanese coastal fishermen who took them back to Japan. Three of the European sailors died of hypothermia and were buried once Drake and his men reached the shore. None of the Asian sailors or Japanese passengers aboard Normanton survived. (Note: According to Inuoe Kiyoshi's "Revising the Treaties"(条約改正, jouyaku kaisei)(1955)there were only 23 Japanese passengers aboard Normanton. Additionally, he asserts that of the 38 European crew members and 1 Indian cabin boy aboard, only 26 crew members (including Drake) and the cabin boy survived, while the other 13 crew members were lost at sea. Furthermore, the official time the boat sank is given as approximately 1:00 AM, October 25th. The time Drake and his crew managed to paddle their way to the shore at Kushimoto and to rescue at 9:00 AM the same dayInoue(1955)p.39)

On 28 October, Inoue Kaoru, the Minister for Foreign Affairs, received a telegram from Matsumoto Kanae, the governor of Wakayama Prefecture, briefly outlining the events surrounding the sinking of Normanton. Inoue was alarmed by the fact that all the Japanese passengers had been lost at sea, and immediately ordered an investigation of the incident. As Drake and most of his European crew members were Britons, under Anglo-Japanese treaties they were subject to extraterritoriality and legally required to be tried by British and not Japanese authorities.

At a hearing at the British consular court in Kobe in early November, Drake and his crew were declared innocent of any wrongdoing. James Troup, the British consul at Kobe, sought to shift blame to the Japanese passengers, and approved the publication of an official statement on 5 November which stated: "The crew urged the Japanese passengers to get to the lifeboats as quickly as possible, but the Japanese failed to understand the English instructions. In turn, they did not comply with the crew's wishes, but instead holed themselves up inside the ship and didn't even try to come out. The crew had no choice but to the leave the Japanese and take to the lifeboats. (Since the Normanton was a cargo ship, there was no staff in place to handle Japanese speaking passengers.)"

When news of the sinking became public in Japan, the Japanese public was outraged. The Tokyo Nichi Nichi Shimbun stated that "If the Captain and the more than 20 seamen under him were able to be rescued, it makes sense that at least one or two Japanese passengers would have been saved along with them. However, the ugly truth is all of them were lost." In another article, the newspaper claimed that "If the passengers had been Westerners, they would have been rescued immediately. These men were left to die because they were Japanese". The Japanese public continued to be outraged upon hearing the consulate's verdict. The Tokyo Nichi Nichi Shinbun responded by stating "No matter how ignorant you may think the Japanese are, to claim that they could stare into the face of danger and fail to recognize the gravity of the situation is absurd. The idea that these people were too stupid to know how to save themselves or even get help from others is a grave fallacy." (Note: 白痴瘋癲 (hakuchifuuten) translates to "crazy fool.")

Donations poured in from across Japan to support the families of the passengers who had died in the sinking. Several Japanese newspapers devoted several days to non-stop coverage of the incident, supported by mournful editorials and articles calling for the removal of Troup and his fellow officials at the consulate. Japanese legal scholars accused Drake of misconduct, while politicians across the country called for a revision of the unequal treaties signed between Japan and Western powers and used the incident as an opportunity to advance their political interests. Some English-language newspapers were also shocked by the verdict. The North-China Herald in Shanghai called the decision to exonerate Drake and his crew a "farce", a "miscarriage of justice" and a "complete whitewash".

The government of Meiji Japan was then in the process of attempting to renegotiate the unequal treaties, and seized on the incident to advance this cause. On 13 November, Inoue ordered Utsumi Tadakatsu, the governor of Hyōgo Prefecture, to prevent Drake and his crew from leaving Kobe. On the same day, Japanese authorities also brought charges of murder against Drake and his men under Utsumi's name in the British Court for Japan in Yokohama. The prosecution began on 14 November, and the court held a preliminary hearing in Kobe before moving the case to Yokohama. On 8 December, the court's judge, Nicholas John Hannen, found Drake guilty of criminal negligence and sentenced him to three months imprisonment. Hannen also ruled that the families of the Japanese passengers were not entitled to any financial compensation. In sentencing Drake, Hannen told him: "We have been accustomed to expect from the merchant service of England heroism and devotion to the interests of the crew and passengers that I am afraid in this case were wanting."

== Aftermath ==
=== Repercussions in Japan ===
The incident led to an increase in anti-British and anti-Western sentiment in Japan, along with an uptick in support among the Japanese public for the renegotiation of the unequal treaties, especially with regard to clauses in those treaties pertaining to extraterritoriality. The incident was picked up by the Japanese Solidarity Movement Party (SMP), then in its infant stages. SMP members raised the issue across Japan, criticizing Inoue's handling of the situation as "coquettish" and "cowardly". As a result of this incident, the movement, which demanded changes with Japan's foreign policy as well as the renegotiation of the unequal treaties, was significantly strengthened.

=== Media ===
==== Theater and Print ====
After the incident, there were some who hoped to turn the incident into a drama for the theater, but the Japanese government, fearing another flare up of civil unrest, effectively shut down the operation. At the same time, a book entitled "A Complete Guide to the Trial of the Events Surrounding the Sinking of the British Ship 'Normanton'" was published immediately after the incident occurred. "The Court Records of the British Steamship "Normanton"" were also published the following year in 1887.

==== "The Normanton Sinks Beneath the Waves" ====
Immediately following the incident, a song titled "The Normanton Sinks Beneath the Waves" (Normanton-go chimbotsu no uta) was written anonymously and quickly caught on with people across the country. There were originally only 36 stanzas to the song, but by the time the incident had come to a close the number had ballooned to 59. The tune is set to the old military standard "With Drawn Swords" (original Japanese version: 抜刀隊, battōtai.)

The song begins with an opening:

The roar of the waves pounding against the shore
Awoken from a dream by a storm in the dead of night
Staring out at the great blue expanse
Wondering where the hell my fellow countrymen are

Try to call out, try to shout, but I have no voice
I seek and search but find not even a shadow
If the rumors are true, the passing moon
and twenty-five of our dearest brethren set sail

Godspeed your journey as the crow flies
We know a little bit about foreign ships
And we know those built by Britons
Are famed for their nautical prowess

Like lambs, we were led aboard the vessel
we passed all too quickly the 300 kilometers
of distant wake and water to old Totomi
only to reach Kumano Inlet in Kishuu

and then in the middle takes a surprising turn:

O, the inhumanity of this foreign ship
The cruel and merciless captain
Whose very name reeks of cowardice
Watched their sorrowful plight from afar

Forgetting all of his responsibility
Hey made fast for a cowardly retreat
Dragging his men along with him
They jumped aboard the lifeboats

They see each others shadows off
Tears of regret cutting quick and deep
They wipe them down and fight them off
You're a hateful bastard, Drake

No matter how different your race may be
No matter how little you know of mercy
You just stood by and watched
You left us there to die, you coward

The above passage contains the opening of the song; the song itself goes on to relate on the legal aspect of the case. (Note: 奴隷鬼 (doreiku) is an intentional pun used instead of Captain Drake's real name in the lyrics of the song. 奴隷 (dorei) means "slave" and 鬼 (read as "ku" here) means demon or ogre. Ienaga(1977)p.103)

=== Marine Rescue Japan ===
Influenced by the events surrounding the incident, a volunteer-based marine rescue group known at the time as the Great Empire of Japan Marine Rescue Group was formed in 1889. It is today known as "Marine Rescue Japan".
