= Sen'yū =

"Sen'yū" (戦友; Comrades) is a Japanese gunka released in 1905 following the Russo-Japanese War. The lyrics were written by Hisen Mashima, and the song was composed by Kazuoki Miyoshi. The first verse, along with that of "Fujin Jūgunka" (婦人従軍歌), was used in the interlude of Hachirō Konoe's song, "Aa Waga Sen'yū". The melody also served as the basis for "Daigaku no Uta" (大学の歌; Song of the University), which was written by Yukitoki Takigawa and published in Asahi Shimbun.

The song describes the soldier's feelings about his partner who had fallen in battle while in Manchuria. In the song, a soldier attempts to aid his fallen friend while ignoring strict military orders, but the friend tells him to continue the combat mission alone.

Although the song has been criticised as "weak" at the time of its publication, it was sung by several army generals. It was also sung in schools across Japan, primarily in the east. Within ten years, however, enka-shi spread the song throughout the country. Following the Mukden Incident in 1931, the song regained popularity as it reminded the Japanese about defending their foothold in Manchuria. During World War II, the Japanese military banned the song on the grounds that it spread war-weariness.
