= Aikoku Kōshinkyoku =

- Columbia release of the Japanese march

Song
- Language: Japanese
- English title: Patriotic March / March for Love of the Fatherland
- Released: December 1937
- Genre: Patriotic song
- Composer: Tokichi Setoguchi
- Lyricist: Yukio Morikawa

"Aikoku Kōshinkyoku" (愛国行進曲; Patriotic March) is a Japanese patriotic song composed by Tokichi Setoguchi with lyrics by Yukio Morikawa. It was released in December 1937.

== History ==
At the outbreak of the Second Sino-Japanese War, the Cabinet of Japan sponsored several public competitions for lyrics to Aikoku Kōshinkyoku in September 1937. There were 57,578 entries for lyrics that were received, and Morikawa's entry was selected as the winner. For the music, 9,555 entries to accompany the lyrics were then received, and Setoguchi was declared the winner. Setoguchi was already a noted composer who had written the Warship March, the official march of the Imperial Navy.

A few days after its release, Aikoku Kōshinkyoku sold a hundred thousand copies from six labels. It sold over a million by 1938.

== In popular culture ==
This song is used in the 1972 Malaysian film Laksamana Do Re Mi, but with different lyrics.

This song appears chanted by children and soldiers in Nobuhiko Obayashi's 2017 Hanagatami.

The first four lines of the song were used by the Filipino folk rock duo Ermar Duet for their 1975 single track "Open City (Ang Maynila)" (B-side of the single "I Shall Return"), a song about the Japanese invasion in the Philippines during World War II.

== Lyrics ==
#	Japanese original (with ruby characters)	Latin script	Literal English translation	Poetic English translation
1.	見(み)よ 東海󠄀(とうかい)の 空󠄁(そら)明󠄁(あ)けて 旭日(きよくじつ) 高(たか)く輝(かゞや)けば 天地(てんち)の正氣(せいき) 潑溂(はつらつ)と 希望󠄁(きばう)は躍󠄁(をど)る 大八洲(おほやしま) おゝ 淸朗󠄃(せいらう)の 朝󠄁雲(あさぐも)に 聳(そび)ゆる 富士(ふじ)の姿󠄁(すがた)こそ 金甌無缺(きんおうむけつ) 搖(ゆる)ぎなき 我(わ)が日本(につぽん)の 誇(ほこり)なれ	Miyo Toukai no sora akete Kyokujitsu takaku kagaya ke ba Tenchi no seiki hatsuratsu to Kibou wa odoru Ōyashima; Oo seirou no asagumo ni Sobiyuru Fuji no sugata koso Kin'ou muketsu yuruginaki Waga Nippon no hokori nare	Look at the bright eastern sky, The sun rises high; The true spirits of the sky and the earth fill all the hearts of Oyashima. Beyond the clouds of dawn Fuji's peak rises. Unwavering and beautiful, It brings pride to my Japan.	Look above the eastern sea clearly dawns the sky; Glorious and bright the sun rideth up on high. Spirit pure of heaven and earth fills the hearts of all, Hope abounding springs--O sweet Isles Imperial. Yonder where the clouds of morn shed a radiant glow, Fuji Mountain, Nippon's pride, rears its crown of snow. Fair of form without a blot nobly doth it stand, And unshakable--a true symbol of our land.
2.	起󠄁(た)て 一系(いつけい)の 大君(おほきみ)を 光(ひかり)と 永久(とは)に戴(いたゞ)きて 臣民(しんみん)我等(われら) 皆(みな)共(とも)に 御稜威(みいつ)に副(そ)はん 大使󠄁命(だいしめい) 往(ゆ)け 八紘(はつくわう)を 宇(いへ)となし 四海󠄀(しかい)の人(ひと)を 導󠄁(みちび)きて 正(たゞ)しき平󠄁和(へいわ) うち建󠄁(た)てん 理想(りさう)は 花󠄁(はな)と咲󠄁(さ)き薰(かを)る	Tate ikkei no Ōkimi o Hikari to towa ni itadaki te Shinmin warera mina tomo ni Miitsu ni sowan Daishimei; Yuke Hakkou o ie to nashi Shikai no hito o michibi kite Tadashiki Heiwa uchitaten Risou wa hana to saki kaoru	He who reigns in power and virtue Is our unbroken light. All of us subjects shall follow And accomplish our great mission. Carry forth the eight cords across the universe, Guide the peoples of the four seas. Let us build a tower of true peace So our ideal shall bloom like a flower !	He who reigns above in power and in virtue dight, Sovereign of unbroken line, is our changeless light. We will follow--one and all loyal subjects, we-- Follow Him aright: fulfil our great destiny! Onward, east, west, north and south. Over land and main! Let us make the world our home, call to fellow-men Everywhere on the four seas, let us build the tower of just peace--let our ideal bloom forth like a flower !
3.	いま 幾度(いくたび)か 我(わ)が上(うへ)に 試練󠄀(しれん)の嵐(あらし) 哮(たけ)るとも 斷乎(だんこ)と守(まも)れ その正義(せいぎ) 進󠄁(すゝ)まん道󠄁(みち)は 一(ひと)つのみ あゝ 悠遠󠄁(いうゑん)の 神󠄀代(かみよ)より 轟(とゞろ)く步調󠄁(ほてう) うけつぎて 大行進󠄁(だいかうしん)の 往(ゆ)く彼方(かなた) 皇國(くわうこく)つねに 榮(さかえ)あれ	Ima ikutabi ka waga ue ni Shiren no arashi takeru tomo Danko to mamore sono seigi Susuman michi wa hitotsu nomi Ā, yūen no Kamiyo yo ri Todoroku hochou uketsugite Daikoushin no yuku kanata Koukoku tsune ni sakae are	Now we face many times Various storms and trials, We must protect and defend righteousness In its single path. Ah, we remember from the divine era, The march of our ancestors that we must follow. We shall go beyond the great march, So our empire will always be glorious !	Though again and yet again trials we may meet, Over us may tempests roar, storms upon us beat, Resolute in heart and mind justice we defend. But one road we know to gain triumph in the end. Hark! Far from the hallowed past of the Age Divine; Sounds our fathers' measured tread. O come fall in line! As we, sons and daughters, march, shines our path before. Glory be unto our land ever, evermore !
