= Teki wa Ikuman =

Song
- Recorded: 1886, 1891
- Genre: gunka
- Songwriters: Yamada Bimyō; Sakunosuke Koyama

Audio sample
- Performeance by Nōsho Benjirō, prior to 1913: file; help

"Teki wa Ikuman" (敵は幾万; Thousands of enemies) is a Japanese gunka. It was composed by Sakunosuke Koyama in 1891, and its lyrics were written by Yamada Bimyō in 1886. The melody, which is in ternary form, uses a major pentatonic scale.

== Lyrics ==
Japanese	Rōmaji	English Translation
敵は幾万ありとても すべて烏合の勢なるぞ 烏合の勢にあらずとも 味方に正しき道理あり 邪はそれ正に勝ちがたく 直は曲にぞ勝栗の 堅き心の一徹は 石に矢の立つためしあり 石に立つ矢のためしあり などて恐るる事やある などてたゆとう事やある	teki wa ikuman aritotemo, subete ugō no sei naruzo. ugō no sei ni arazu tomo, mikata ni tadashiki dōri ari! ja wa sore sei ni kachi gataku, choku wa kyoku ni zo kachiguri no kataki kokoro no ittetsu wa ishi ni ya no tatsu tameshi ari. Ishi ni tatsu ya no tameshi ari. nadote osoruru koto ya aru! nadote tayutō koto ya aru!	Thousands of enemies may come, but they are only disorderly troops! Even if they are not, we have always absolute justice! The evil, by nature, cannot defeat the justice, and the justice must defeat the evil. Where there is a strong will, there is always a way, as Li Guang's arrow pierced a stone. What do we fear at all? Nothing in the world shall threaten us!
風に閃く連隊旗 記紋は昇る朝日子よ 旗は飛びくる弾丸に 破るることこそ誉れなれ 身は日の本の兵士よ 旗にな愧じそ進めよや 斃るるまでも進めよや 裂かるるまでも進めよや 旗にな愧じそ耻じなせそ などて恐るる事やある などてたゆとう事やある	kaze ni hirameku rentaiki, shirushi wa noboru asahiko yo. hata wa tobikuru dangan ni yabururu hodo koso homare nare. mi wa hinomoto no tsuwamono yo. hata ni na haji so susume yoya. taoruru mademo susume yoya! sakaruru mademo susume yoya! hata ni na haji so, haji na se so. nadote osoruru koto ya aru! nadote tayutō koto ya aru!	Our regimental flags are streaming: the marks are all the Rising Sun! The more our flags are torn by shots, the more we get the honors in the field! You, Japanese soldier, don't be behind your flags! Go on until the very end! Go on until the heroic death! Don't be behind your flags! What do we fear at all? Nothing in the world shall threaten us!
破れて逃ぐるは国の耻 進みて死ぬるは身の誉れ 瓦となりて残るより 玉となりつつ砕けよや 畳の上にて死ぬことは 武士の為すべき道ならず 骸を馬蹄にかけられつ 身を野晒になしてこそ 世に武士の義といわめ などて恐るる事やある などてたゆとう事やある	yaburete niguru wa kuni no haji. susumite shinuru wa mi no homare. kawara to narite nokoru yori tama to naritsutsu kudake yoya. tatami no ue nite shinu koto wa bushi no nasubeki michi narazu. mukuro o batei ni kakeraretsu mi o nozarashi ni nashite koso yo ni mononofu no gi to iwame. nadote osoruru koto ya aru! nadote tayutō koto ya aru!	If you run away, you bring our country great disgrace; if you die bravely, you win many glories. Instead of surviving shamefully, you must fall admirably! If you will be a samurai, don't pass away at home! It is not until your body is hoofed and remains on the front without burying it that people say: You are a true samurai! What do we fear at all? Nothing in the world shall threaten us!
