= Fall of Osaka Castle =

Capture of Osaka Castle by pro-Imperial forces during the Boshin War

Coordinates: 34°41′14″N 135°31′33″E

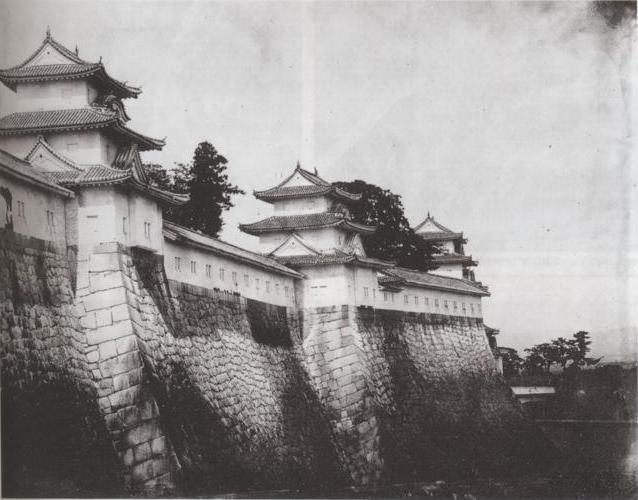
Osaka Castle rampart in 1865

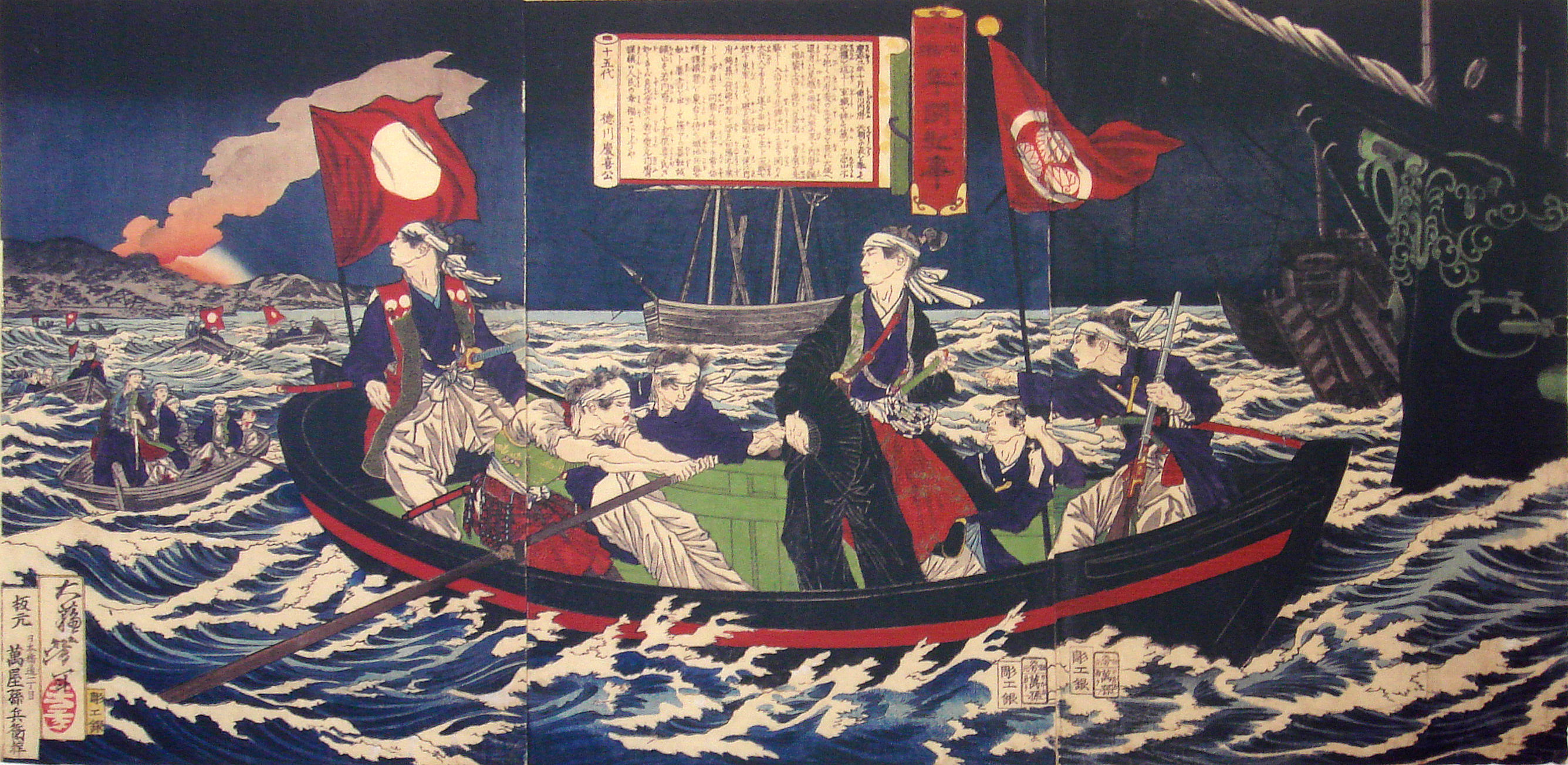
Tokugawa Yoshinobu leaving for Edo, looking at the fire at Osaka castle in the background.

The fall of Osaka Castle occurred between Imperial and Tokugawa shogunate forces during the Boshin War in Japan, where soon after the Battle of Toba–Fushimi, the Tokugawa-held Osaka Castle was captured by pro-Imperial "Kangun" forces on February 2, 1868.

== History ==
The Castle of Osaka was symbolic as it was the power-base of the Tokugawa Bakufu in Western Japan. It was also historically significant and it had been the location of the Siege of Osaka, the decisive battle which established the power of the Tokugawa more than two centuries before.

Following the Tokugawa Shogunate's defeat in the Battle of Toba–Fushimi on January 31, 1868, troops loyal to the bakufu tried to regroup under Tokugawa Yoshinobu. At Osaka Castle, Tokugawa Yoshinobu gathered his advisors and military leaders to plan strategy and, to boost morale, advised that he would personally take to the field as commander of bakufu forces.

However, on that evening, Tokugawa Yoshinobu slipped away from Osaka Castle accompanied by the daimyōs of Aizu and Kuwana to escape back to Edo on the shogunate warship Kaiyō maru. As Kaiyō maru had not arrived, he took refuge for the night on an American warship, USS Iroquois, anchored in Osaka Bay. The Kaiyō maru arrived two hours later and picked up the Tokugawa party.

When the remnants of his forces learned that the Shōgun had abandoned them, they departed Osaka Castle, which was later surrendered to Imperial forces without resistance. The castle was seized and burnt on February 2, 1868.

Once the Osaka Castle was burnt and reduced to ruins by the new government, it was later used as a ground for military barracks. Yoshinobu later stated that he had been disturbed by the Imperial approval given to the actions of Satsuma and Chōshū, and, once the Imperial brocade banner had appeared, he had lost all will to fight.
