= Sakatayama double suicide =

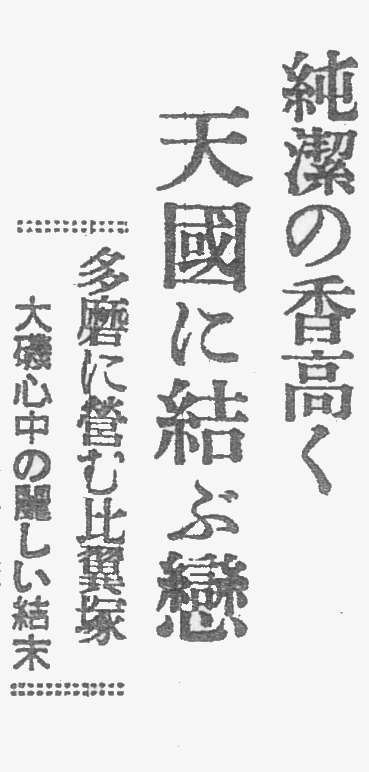
The Tokyo Nichinichi Shimbun (May 13, 1932) wrote a headline symbolizing the Sakatayama Shinjū Incident. The article reported that the two were to be buried forever in Tama Cemetery.

Sakatayama double suicide (Japanese: 坂田山心中, さかたやましんじゅう, Sakatayama Shinjū) is the 1932 double suicide incident and subsequent theft of a female corpse in Japan. This affected a number of young men and women who committed double suicide.

== Incident ==
=== Double suicide of a man and a woman ===
The incident was reported in the evening edition of the Tokyo Nichi Nichi Shimbun dated May 10, 1932, as follows

At about 11:00 a.m. on May 9, a man and a woman were found dead after drinking sublimated water at the top of Mt Sakata in Ōiso town, Shōnan . The man was 25-26 years old, wearing a Keio University uniform and cap, and the woman was 21-22 years old, looking like a young lady. Both were lying in a wooded area in good manners, with a bowl of nameless flowers beside their pillows.

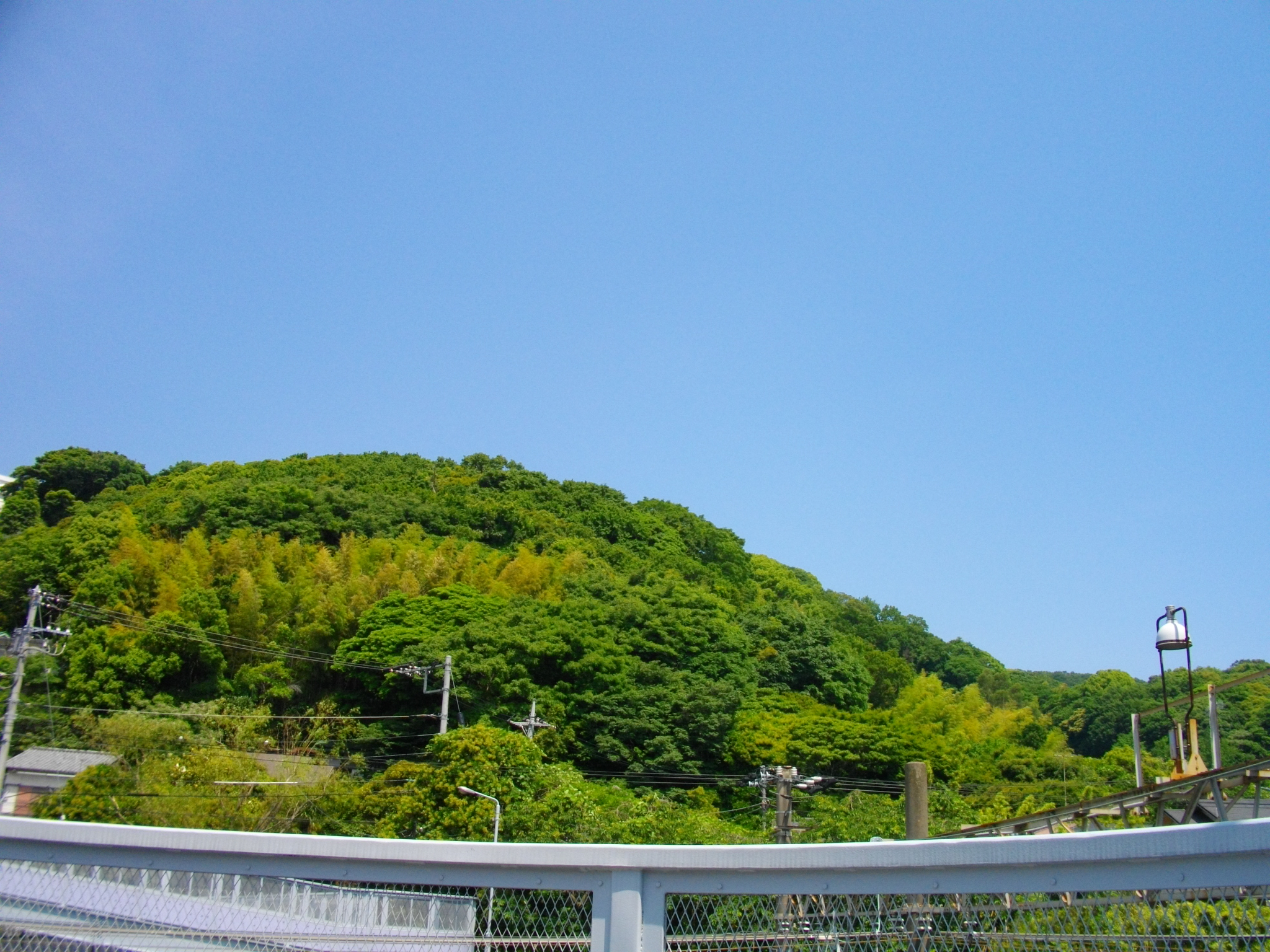
Mt. Sakata (elevation 111 m, 35.3144°N 139.3117°E), the site of the incident

The name "Mt. Sakata" was added for convenience at this time by the reporter, as he could not find it after research.

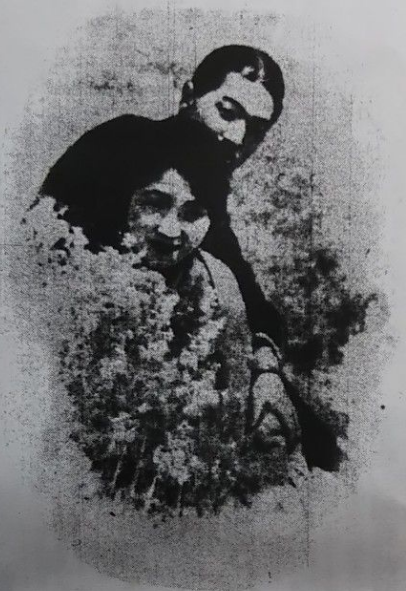
A photo of the two taken with a self-timer

The Tokyo Nichi Nichi Shimbun dated November 11 published a photo of the two taken with a self-timer. It further explained the background of the two men. These were all of interest to the Japanese public at the time;

- The man is Zusho Goro, and the woman is Yuyama Yaeko.
- Both were members of the Anglican Church in Japan.
- The Goro's father had promised to marry Yaeko and build a house for their after Goro graduated from college.
- Yaeko was the daughter of a wealthy man in Shizuoka Prefecture.
- The woman's parents were opposed to the marriage and proceeded to arrange a marriage between the woman and another man.
- Yaeko's sister also died an unusual death.

=== Woman's body disappears ===
The next day, a surprising story was reported in the evening edition newspapers. The Tokyo Nichi Nichi Shimbun reported,

A strange occurrence at the Oiso cemetery. A woman's corpse is stolen. She's the one who had a double suicide with a Keio University student. Is the culprit a pervert? Revenge?

The two wills were clearly written at this stage. At this time, the man's suicide note was revealed.

The suicide note was dated May 5.

If I do not return tomorrow night, the 6th, please consider me dead. I regret that I cannot repay even one ten-thousandth of what many people have done for me. I did not talk to anyone because I did not want Yaeko-san to think I was a coward. I visited the grave of my birth mother. Soon I will be able to be near her. Goodbye everyone. I need to get up early tomorrow.

=== Finding the body ===
The Oiso Police Station conducted a large-scale search and found the body on the morning of the 11th. In the evening edition of the 12th, each newspaper carried an article with a sensational title. The Tokyo Asahi, for example, reported, Not a stitch of clothing on. Discovered at Oiso Beach. Who buried her in the sand? A woman's black hair crawling on the sand.

The doctor and police chief who performed the autopsy on the woman's body told journalists that the woman was a virgin, which further sensationalized the story in various newspapers. The Tokyo Nichinichi Shimbun, for example, reported, The fragrance of purity is high, and love tied to heaven.

On the 13th, there was a young man and woman who jumped onto a Chūō Main Line train outside Kofu City and committed suicide, carrying a photo of Goro and Yaeko that appeared in the newspaper.

=== Announcement of movie adaptation ===
On May 14, four days after the incident, Shochiku's film department announced that it would make a film about the incident and begin shooting within a few days. The film was released as early as June 10, as noted below.

On May 18, police announced that the body snatcher was a 65-year-old crematorium employee. The Tokyo Asahi Shimbun reported this on May 19: "A 65-year-old crematorium employee finally confessed on the 10th day. He caressed the corpse very much on a dusky moonlit night. It was his curiosity after he heard that the corpse was beautiful," it reported. However, the alleged perpetrator stated years later that this was not true.

== Film adaptation ==
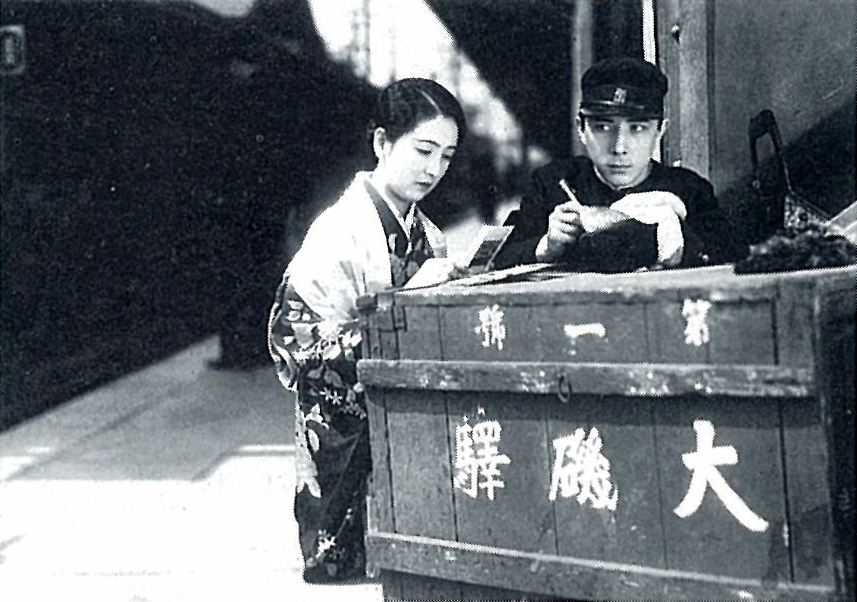
A scene from the movie "Love Tied to Heaven."

The headline The fragrance of purity is high, and love tied to heaven written by Tokyo Nichi Nichi Shimbun became the talk of the masses who believed the incident was platonic love. Shochiku's film department released a film on June 10 titled Love Tied to Heaven.

== Influence ==
The film caused quite a sensation, and many men and women committed suicide while watching the film with sublimated water, or listening to the film's theme song. In addition, there were 20 couples of men and women who committed suicide at Sakata Mountain, where the incident took place, in 1932 alone. By 1935, the number of suicides (including attempted suicides) numbered approximately 200.

In Oiso Town, where the incident took place, local residents made money by selling "married couple buns" and "Sakatayama memorial postcard".

A more factual film was also made, but it was not as popular.

In the month following the incident, Count Katsu Kuwashi, the adopted son of Katsu Kaishū and the tenth son of Tokugawa Yoshinobu, committed suicide with his love concubinage. The Sakatayama double suicide incident and the hit movie triggered the mass media to be flooded with words such as "double suicide," "emotional death," and "heaven."

The following year, in February 1933, two female students jumped to their deaths in Mount Mihara. Although no one involved in the Mt. Mihara incident has said about the Sakatayama Shinjū, many commentaries in later years believe that influence by the positive media coverage of the incident. As a result of Mt. Mihara incident, 804 men and 140 women jumped to their deaths on Mount Mihara in 1933. This made Mount Mihara a tourist attraction, and the Yomiuri Shimbun organized a tour to take a gondola down to the crater for a photo shoot.

== Later years ==
In 1950, 28 years after the incident, a newspaper reporter who accompanied the doctor who performed the autopsy at the top of the mountain said that the doctor made a remark on his way down that smacked of the woman not actually being a virgin.

Some books consider the identity of Zusho Goro, one of the main characters in the incident, to be the great-grandson of Zusho Hirosato.

== See also ==
- Shinjū
- Platonic love
- Copycat suicide
