= Warship March =

1897 march composed by Tokichi Setoguchi

1938 King Records release of the Japanese March

KING 21144. Played by the Imperial Japanese Navy Band in 1937.

Performed with lyrics by Fumiko Noshō in 1913.

The Warship March (軍艦行進曲, Gunkan kōshinkyoku) is a Japanese march composed in 1897 by Tokichi Setoguchi. It was the official march of the Imperial Japanese Navy and is the official march of its successor, the Japan Maritime Self-Defense Force (JMSDF). In Japan, the march is also commonly referred to as the Gunkan March (軍艦マーチ, Gunkan māchi).

== History ==
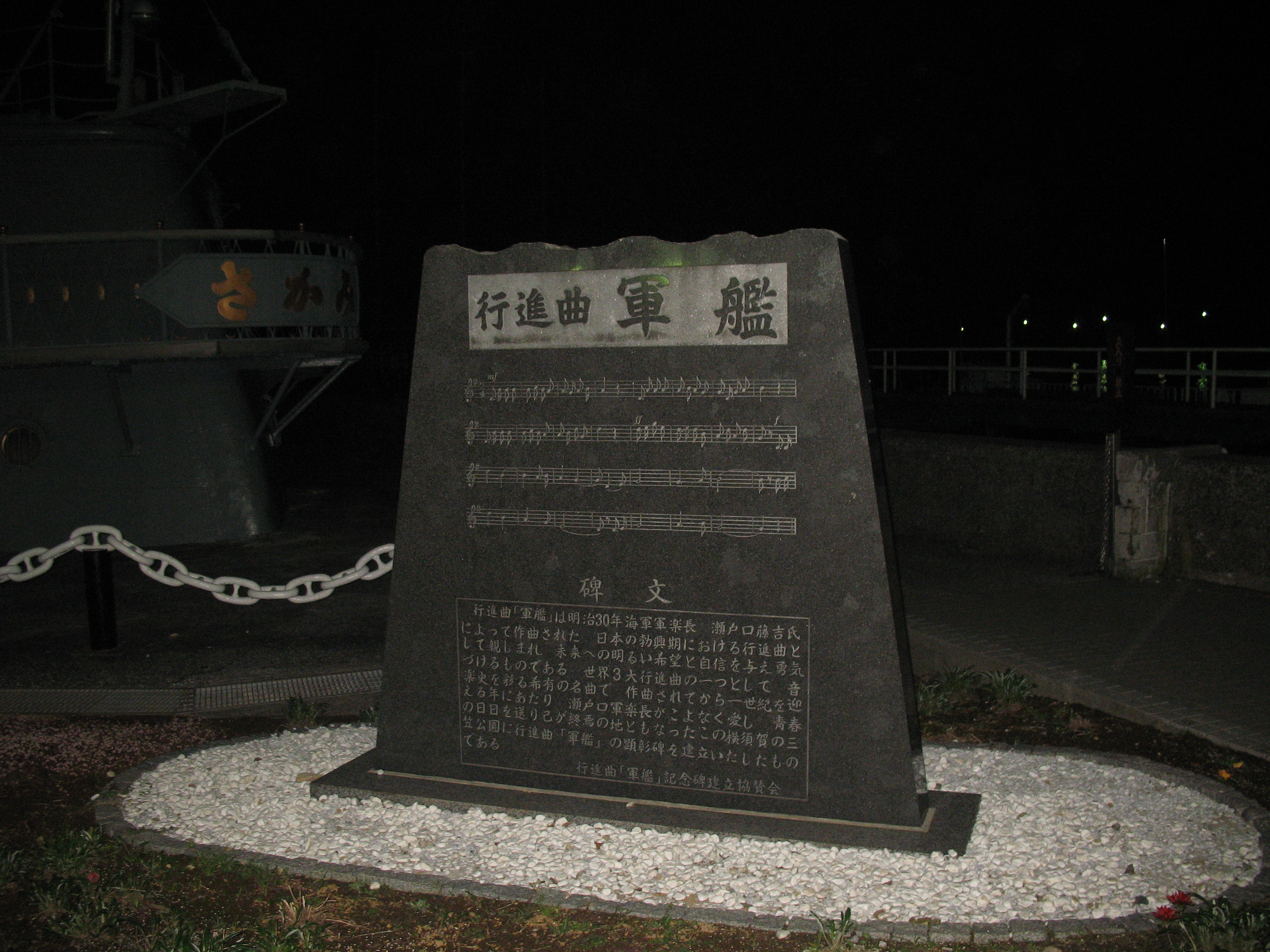
Monument in Yokosuka, Kanagawa Prefecture commemorating the Warship March.

The march, which sets to music lyrics by Hiraku Toriyama, was originally composed in B-flat major, but was transposed to F-major in the Taishō era in order to make it more manageable for men's voices. The third part of the song contains the lyrics of Umi Yukaba.

Three years after its composition, Setoguchi made an instrumental arrangement of the song for the Imperial Japanese Navy Band where he served as its bandleader. The march was subsequently adopted as the Imperial Japanese Navy's official march. The Warship March was performed in Europe during the Imperial Japanese Navy Band's tour of Europe in 1907.

When under the Nipponophone label Japan produced its first gramophone records in 1910, the Warship March was among the first records issued.

After Japan's defeat in the Pacific War, the Warship March was outlawed by the U.S. occupation forces. However, after the Treaty of San Francisco was signed, the march was revived by the Imperial Japanese Navy's successor, the Japan Maritime Self-Defense Force. The march's fame has endured in post-war Japan, making numerous appearances for pachinko parlors during that time.

In 1996, a monument commemorating the Warship March was erected at the Mikasa Park in Yokosuka, Kanagawa.
