= Gunka =

Japanese term for military music

Gunka (軍歌; lit. 'military song') is the Japanese term for military music. While in standard use in Japan it applies both to Japanese songs and foreign songs such as "The Battle Hymn of the Republic", as an English language category it refers to songs produced by the Empire of Japan in between roughly 1868 and 1943.

== History ==
=== Meiji Restoration period ===
During the Meiji Restoration Period, Western composers and teachers taught Japanese people to write and make music in the Western classical tradition. Military marches were adopted in Japan, as part of a trend of Western customs integrating into the Japanese culture. Gunka was one of the major Western-influenced musical forms that emerged in this period and were used to encourage patriotism in the post-restoration era.

=== Empire of Japan ===
In 1871, Japan founded the Imperial Japanese Army and Navy band. During the late nineteenth century, Japanese conductors japanized the band repertoire. In the period of imperialist expansion of Japan in Asia and the Pacific, gunka was used to glorify anyone that "fought" on the home front. Japanese gunka were consciously constructed to engender loyalty and warm feelings towards the nation.

In 1921, a disarmament agreement signed at the Washington Conference of 1921 obligated Japan to reduce its army during the Taishō Era (1912-1926) and the first years of Shōwa, which included the suspension of five of six army bands. As the Japanese Navy was not affected by the agreement, the Navy bands remained without problems. In this peace period, the main topic of gunkas was the importance of working hard, such as happened the songs "Battleship Duties" (Kansen Kinmu, by Setouguchi Tōkichi), and "Monday, Monday, Tuesday, Wednesday, Thursday, Friday and Friday" (Getsu Getsu Ka Sui Moku Kin Kin, by Egucho Yoshi).

Up until the surrender of the wartime Japanese government in 1945, gunka were taught in schools both in Japan proper and in the larger Empire. Some gunka songs derived from children songs called shōka. In 1893, the Japanese educator Isawa Shūji released the shōka public school song "Come, Soldiers, Come" (Kitare ya Kitare). This song became a melody in military marches, called "Defense of the Empire" (Mikuni no Mamori), and was also included in the song "Kimigayo March" (Kimigayo Kōshinkyoku). Another gunka derived from a shōka was War Comrade (Sen'yū), released in 1905 and remains popular. The song talks about loyalty and friendship and advocated assisting a fellow soldier in battle, which was against the Japanese military code. For that reason, the song was banned during the Asia-Pacific War. Shōka songs "Lieutenant Hirose" (Hirose Chūsa, 1912), "The Meeting at Suishiying", (Suishiei no Kaiken, 1906) are other examples of public school songs that became part of the gunka repertory.

=== Post-war period ===
During the Occupation gunka performance was banned. However, the ban was lifted with the signing of the Treaty of San Francisco in 1952, and these gunka experienced a mild "boom" in the late 1960s, and by the early 1970s they had regained popularity in Japanese-controlled Micronesia and parts of Southeast Asia. A famous example of a Japanese gunka was the song "Sen'yū" written during the Russo-Japanese War.

Gunka were common in pachinko parlors and are still commonly played in karaoke bars and shrine gates.

== Characteristics ==
=== Instruments ===
Instruments of Western musical tradition are common in Gunka songs, such as trumpet, trombone, tuba, timpani, cymbals, glockenspiel, snare, and woodwind instruments as clarinet, flute and piccolo.

=== Metre, rhythm and tone ===
Due to its origin in military marches, gunka has a metre in four-four time. The most common rhythmical motif is a music theme of six quarters and a triplet pair. Gunka marches are composed in a major tone.

=== Topics ===
Fighting on the battlefield, sending a son to war, and waiting for a father's return were common topics in Japanese war songs.

Almost all early war songs were epics, in which the state of war was described in a concrete narrative form. As time went by, however, the motifs present in the war songs were narrowed down almost exclusively to the enhancement of hostility and morale ... on the basis of the fact that the single unit of recording time was three minutes.

— Gunka to Nipponjin, quoted in Sugita 1972, 33

== Notable gunka ==
- "Warship March"
- "Miyasan, Miyasan"
- "Aa Kurenai no Chi wa Moyuru"
- "Battōtai"
- "Fujin Jūgunka"
- "Roei no Uta"
- "Shussei Heishi o Okuru Uta"
- "Teki wa Ikuman"
- "Umi Yukaba"
- "Yuki no Shingun"

== Bibliography ==
- Satoshi Sugita (1972). "Cherry blossoms and rising sun: a systematic and objective analysis of gunka (Japanese war songs) in five historical periods (1868-1945) ". Dissertation submitted to Ohio State University.
