= Tetsu Nakamura (actor) =

Japanese-Canadian actor and singer (1908–1992)

- Born: 19 September 1909; Vancouver, British Columbia, Canada
- Died: 3 August 1992 (aged 82); Kiyose, Tokyo, Japan
- Other name: Sally Nakamura
- Occupations: Actor; singer
- Years active: 1941-1984
- Spouse: Sachi Nakamura
- Children: Yū Terashima

Japanese name
- Kanji: 中村哲
- Hiragana: なかむら てつ
- Katakana: ナカムラ テツ
Transcriptions
- Romanization: Nakamura Tetsu

Alternative Japanese name
- Kanji: 中村聰
- Hiragana: なかむら さとし
- Katakana: ナカムラ サトシ
Transcriptions
- Romanization: Nakamura Satoshi

Satoshi Nakamura (Japanese: 中村聰, Hepburn: Nakamura Satoshi; 19 September 1909 – 3 August 1992), known professionally as Tetsu Nakamura (中村哲, Nakamura Tetsu), was a Japanese-Canadian actor and baritone. He was active in feature films from the 1940s to the 1980s.

== Early years ==
Nakamura was born in Vancouver to Japanese parents. His father was a British Columbia lumber executive and a semi-pro baseball player with the Vancouver Asahi, which Nakamura himself later joined in 1926, though his promising career was cut short due to a shoulder injury. He studied at Britannia Secondary School before enrolling at a music academy to become a baritone singer. His nickname as a child was "Sally".

After graduating, he performed on radio and in recitals before moving to Japan in 1940. There he enrolled in Nikkatsu's film acting school, and graduated in 1941. In the meantime, he was selected by the opera singer Yoshie Fujiwara to appear as Escamillo in Carmen in a performance at the Kabuki-za.

== Career ==
He became a contract actor at the Toho Studios in 1942, and started appearing in roles in such films as The Opium War (1943), Ano hata o ute, and Aru yoru no tonosama (1946). He starred in a stage musical at the Imperial Theatre opposite Yoshiko Yamaguchi in 1947.

After touring the United States as part of Fujiwara's opera company in 1953, he concentrated on film acting.

With his fluency in English, he often appeared in foreign co-productions. He played the antagonist in Tokyo File 212 (1951) and a supporting role in Geisha Girl (1952). Writing about Tokyo File 212 in his book Korean War Filmography, Robert J. Lentz opined that "Nakamura [was] smooth and oily as the villain Oyama, who at heart [was] as much a capitalist as a Communist".

His other prominent roles include Dr. Robert Suzuki in George Breakston's science-fiction horror film The Manster (1962), Japanese Ambassador in the international co-production Red Sun (1971), Dr. Kawamoto in the B-movie The Last Dinosaur (1977) and other roles in Oriental Evil (1951), Futari no hitomi (1952), The H-Man (1958), Mothra (1961), The Lost World of Sinbad (1963) and Kokusai himitsu keisatsu: Kagi no kagi (1965).

He was also supervised the translation and dubbing of English-language films, and featured in the Japanese dubs of the Walt Disney Animated films Pinocchio (1940), Cinderella (1950), Lady and the Tramp (1955), and Sleeping Beauty (1959).

He appeared on television well into the 1980s. In addition to acting, Nakamura also performed as a jazz vocalist until around the mid-1970s, and hosted an English-language program on NHK. He was the emcee of Peter, Paul and Mary's second Japanese tour, and appears on their live album Deluxe/Peter, Paul and Mary in Japan.

== Personal life ==
With his wife Sachi, Nakamura was the father of mangaka Yū Terashima (born 1949). In 2020, Terashima published a Japanese-language biography of his father, Entertainer Under the Occupation: Sally Nakamura (占領下のエンタテイナー : 日系カナダ人俳優&歌手・中村哲が生きた時代).

=== Death ===
Nakamura died of heart failure on August 3, 1992 in Kiyose of heart failure, at the age of 82.

== Partial filmography ==
- Ano hata o ute (1944)
- Kôfuku eno shôtai (1947)
- Koun no isu (1948)
- Tokyo File 212 (1951) - Mr. Oyama
- Oriental Evil (1951) - Noritomu Moriaji
- Geisha Girl (1952) - Tetsu Nakano
- Futari no hitomi (1952)
- Senkan Yamato (1953)
- Madame Butterfly (1954) - Yamadori
- Tokyo da you okkasan (1957)
- The Mysterians (1957) - Dr. Koda
- The H-Man (1958) - Mr. Chin, gangster
- Yaju shisubeshi (1959)
- The Manster (1959) - Dr. Robert Suzuki
- Wakai koibitotachi (1959) - Customer at Bar B
- Kaoyaku to bakudan musume (1959)
- Samurai to oneechan (1960) - Daisaku Tsubaki
- Storm Over the Pacific (1960)
- Gasu ningen dai 1 gô (1960) - Journalist
- The Big Wave (1961) - Toru's Father
- Honkon no yoru (1961)
- Mothra (1961) - Nelson's Henchman
- Attack Squadron! (1963)
- Gojuman-nin no isan (1963) - Asian man
- Interpol Códe 8 (1963) - Binh Hoa
- The Lost World of Sinbad (1963) - Chief Archer
- Atragon (1963) - Warship Captain
- Kokusai himitsu keisatsu: Tora no kiba (1964) - Okada
- Hi no ataru isu (1965)
- Kokusai himitsu keisatsu: Kagi no kagi (1965) - Sritai
- Kureji no daiboken (1965)
- Nippon ichi no gorigan otoko (1966)
- Kokusai himitsu keisatsu: Zettai zetsu (1967) - Head of ZZZ Hong Kong Branch Office
- Latitude Zero (1969) - Dr. Okada
- Space Amoeba (1970) - Chieftain Ombo
- Red Sun (1971) - Japanese Ambassador
- Tidal Wave (1973) - Philippines Ambassador to United Nations
- Marco (1973) - Sea Captain
- Karei-naru ichizoku (1974) - Shirakawa
- Mastermind (1976) - Mr. Hiruta
- The Last Dinosaur (1977) - Dr. Kawamoto (final film role)
