= Tokyo File 212 =

1951 film

- Theatrical release poster
- Directed by: Dorrell McGowan; Stuart E. McGowan
- Written by: Dorrell McGowan; Stuart E. McGowan
- Story by: George P. Breakston
- Produced by: George P. Breakston; Dorrell McGowan
- Starring: See below
- Cinematography: Herman Schopp
- Edited by: Martin G. Cohn
- Music by: Albert Glasser
- Production companies: Breakston–McGowan Productions; Tonichi Enterprises Company
- Distributed by: RKO Radio Pictures (United States)
- Release dates: January 24, 1951 (Japan); May 2, 1951 (Washington, D.C.)
- Running time: 84 minutes
- Countries: United States; Japan
- Language: English
- Budget: US$700,000 (approx.)

Tokyo File 212 (Japanese: 東京ファイル212) is a 1951 Japanese-American coproduction spy film directed by Dorrell and Stuart E. McGowan. George Breakston wrote the film's script and coproduced it with Dorrell McGowan jointly under the banner of their newly formed Breakston–McGowan Productions and the Tonichi Enterprises Company of Japan. Lawyer Melvin Belli serves as executive producer for the film and composer Albert Glasser provided the musical score.

The film stars Florence Marly, Robert Peyton, Tetsu Nakamura, Katsuhiko Haida, Reiko Otani, Tatsuo Saitō and Heihachirô Ôkawa. Real-life geisha Ichimaru appear in a song sequence. The plot concerns an American intelligence agent (Peyton) sent to Japan to pursue a suspected communist (Haida).

Principal photography began on July 21, 1950 in Japan and was completed in 36 days, making it Hollywood's first feature film to be shot entirely in Japan. RKO Pictures distributed the film in the U.S.

== Plot ==
American intelligence agent Jim Carter is sent to Japan under the cover of a journalist to find Taro Matsudo, Carter's old college friend, who is helping the communists there. At his hotel, Carter meets Steffi Novak, a mysterious woman who speaks six languages and wishes to accompany him. Together they are taken to a bar by Joe, an undercover agent posing as a taxi driver. Carter tries to approach Taro, but Taro does not want to meet him.

Jim receives a telegram informing him to reach the island of Enoshima, where he meets Taro, who refuses to divulge any information about his commander. He meets Taro's father Matsudo, a government official who tells him that Matsudo aspired to be a kamikaze pilot, but when Japan surrendered during World War II, he was disappointed with the government and sided with the communists. When Jim returns to his hotel room, he is beaten by a group of Japanese men who tell him to stay away from Taro.

Steffi meets Oyama, who promises her that, in return for spying on Carter, she would be able to meet her sister in North Korea. However, Steffi does not know that her sister is dead. She takes Carter to meet Oyama at an enkai party at a resort in Atami. Carter learns that the food offered to him is poisoned. He is forced to eat it, returns to the hotel and unexpectedly survives. He visitis the Takarazuka Theater in Tokyo, where he meets Taro's lover Namiko and learns more about Taro. After he leaves, Namiko is kidnapped and thrown from a moving car, and she is hospitalized soon after. Once Taro learns of the incident, he rushes to meet her but refuses to believe that his organization had any involvement with the accident. After having gained evidence of Steffi spying on him, Carter arrests her. When she tells him that she was doing it to meet her sister, Carter informs her that her sister was murdered at Oyama's order. Steffi vows revenge against Oyama and resolves to help Carter.

Oyama intends to provoke a railroad strike in order to halt the war efforts. Matsudo and Taro face each other at the railway tracks, where both deliver speeches to the workers. The gathering soon becomes a brawl and several people, including Matsudo, are badly injured. The police intervene to restore peace. Taro tries to meet Namiko at the hospital but finds her dead. Oyama's henchmen take him to his office, and when Taro learns of Oyama's plan to kill Carter, Steffi and Matsudo with a time bomb, he jumps from the window to force them away from the bench under which the bomb is placed. Carter reaches Oyama's place with his associates and the police. Seeing no option left, Oyama confesses his crimes, angering his right-hand man, who stabs him for disloyalty to their organization. The man is shot and Oyama dies. After completing his mission, Carter returns to the United States, with Steffi and Matsudo bidding him farewell.

== Cast ==
- Florence Marly as Steffi Novak
- Lee Frederick as Jim Carter
- Katsuhiko Haida as Taro Matsuto
- Reiko Otani as Namiko
- Tatsuo Saitō as Mr. Matsuto
- Tetsu Nakamura as Mr. Oyama
- Suisei Matsui
- Maj. Richard W.N. Childs, U.S. Army Reserve as Himself
- Lt. Richard Finiels GHQ, Far East Command as Himself
- Cpl. Stuart Zimmerley, Military Police Corps as Himself
- Pvt. James Lyons, Military Police Corps as Himself
- Byron Michie as Mr. Jeffrey
- Ichimaru as Herself

Heihachirô Ôkawa, Jun Tazaki and Dekao Yokoo also play minor roles. The Takarazuka Revue troupe performs the Imperial Theatre sequence.

== Production ==
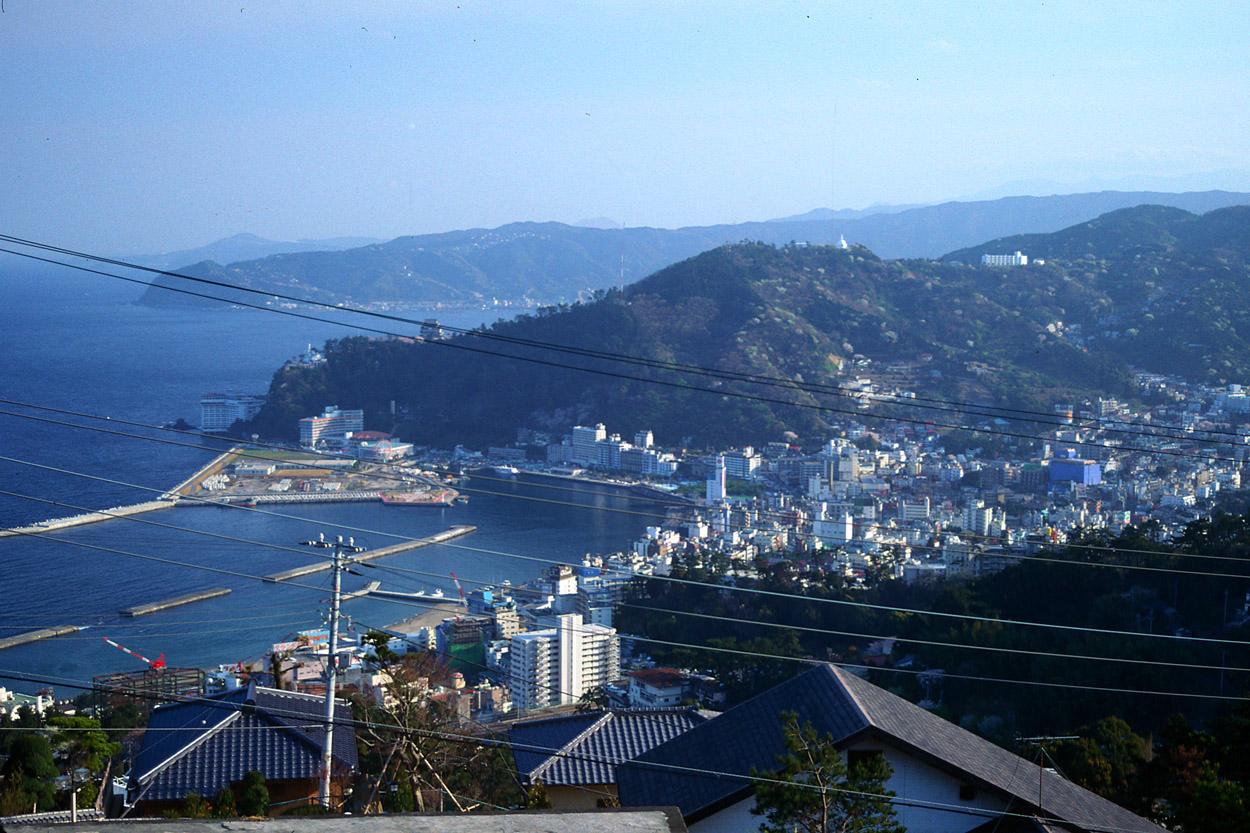
A key scene was filmed in the seaside resort city of Atami.

Actor-director George Paul Breakston drafted Tokyo File 212 and met Hollywood studio executives and producers with the script. Dorrell and Stewart McGowan, in addition to writing the film's screenplay, agreed to back the production and established the company Breakston–McGowan Productions, Inc. for the venture. Lawyer Melvin Belli invested $10,000 in the project and was credited as an executive producer. Herman Schopp handled the cinematography while Albert Glasser provided the musical score. The production company partnered with Suzuki Ikuzo's Tonichi Enterprises Company, which agreed to provide half of the budget as well as Japanese actors and crew members in return for half of the film's earnings in Japan and the United States.

Lloyd Nolan was originally cast as the male lead, although Robert Peyton ultimately played the role, his first film appearance as a lead. Newspaper reports indicated that Leif Erickson and Sessue Hayakawa were also considered for prominent roles. Florence Marly, due to star in a large-budget Mexican feature and under contract with Allied Artists, was borrowed for the film. The cast also included Tatsuo Saitō, Suisei Matsui, Tetsu Nakamura, Katsuhiko Haida and Reiko Otani, who was cast after an audition. Tokyo File 212 was the film debut of geisha Ichimaru.

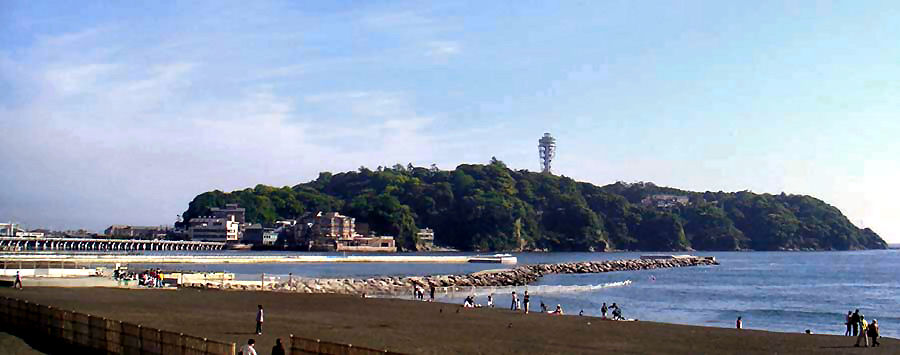
Another key scene was filmed on the island of Enoshima.

Tokyo File 212 was approved by Douglas MacArthur in May 1950. It was the only film approved by MacArthur for filming in Japan and he provided the filmmakers with intelligence files to facilitate their research. He also provided interpreters and intelligence officers, who appear in the film. Real military generals and detectives were cast. Forty kamikaze pilots were also included in the cast.

American actors and crew members reached Japan on July 21, 1950. Principal photography began on the same day under the working title of Danger City. The film was completed in 36 days and its final version was prepared in two months. Tokyo File 212 was Hollywood's first feature film to be shot entirely in Japan. Most of the film was shot in Tokyo, and some key scenes were shot in Atami and Enoshima. One scene was shot at Tokyo's Imperial Theater. At the Ohuzumi studio in Tokyo, 26 sets were constructed. The wide ballroom set for the underground bar scene was built for $160. For the final bomb explosion scene, the Japanese used 15 black-powdered bombs instead of the preplanned six. The blast caused Dorrel McGowan to fall on his back and alarmed the city's air patrol and the military police, and fire wagons along with riot squads rushed to the scene, unaware that the explosion was part of a film. A few crew members, including Marly, were injured in the explosion.

For a street celebration scene shot in Enoshima, the Japanese extras drank sake to make the scene authentic. The rail-strike scene took inspiration from a similar strike that had occurred in 1949, and eight trains and 200 engineers were provided for the scene. Several actors were injured while filming the scene. Communists issued threats and the Japanese cast and crew were unwilling to work unless more security was provided.

The production team had access to places where only military cars and trucks were allowed. The film was completed with a budget of approximately $700,000. Dorrel McGowan later stated that it would have cost millions if the film had been shot in the U.S. After returning from Japan, Dorell McGowan declared that the Japanese were the greatest actors in the world. He also praised the set-building techniques employed by the Japanese.

== Release ==
The film opened in Japan on January 24, 1951 and premiered in Washington, D.C. on May 2, 1951. Geisha girls were brought from Japan to perform at the film's opening in several American cities.

== Reception ==
In a contemporary review for The New York Times, critic A. H. Weiler wrote: "[T]his awkward melodrama dealing with the work of an Army Intelligence operative in exposing a Communist cell in the Japanese capital is fiction on a comic-strip level. And neither the dialogue, which makes vague ideological references, nor the acting, which is muscular and uninspired, give this limp fiction much substance. ... This is one 'file' that should never have been plucked from the archives."

Critic John L. Scott of the Los Angeles Times called the story ""routine spy business" and wrote: "The production moves slowly and abrupt cutting doesn't help the matter much. There are some moments of suspense and action."

In The Boston Globe, critic Cyrus Durgin wrote: "So far as the story goes, it is a run-of-the-mine thriller, somewhat vague in certain details, though exciting all the way. But what gives the picture its unusual flavor is the authentic Japanese background."

The Catholic organization National Legion of Decency considered the film morally objectionable in part and assigned it a B rating.

== Soundtrack ==
Tokyo File 212

Film score by Albert Glasser
- Released: 1987
- Producer: Screen Archives Entertainment

Albert Glasser chronology
Three Desperate Men	Tokyo File 212	Oriental Evil

Albert Glasser provided the music score and wrote each song.

Original soundtrack
No.	Title	Length
1.	"Main Title"	1:46
2.	"This Is Tokyo"	2:37
3.	"Jazz Cues"	1:53
4.	"Jim Meets Steffi"	2:10
5.	"Steffi Is Tired"	2:00
6.	"Kamikaze Class"	2:08
7.	"The Telegram"	1:39
8.	"The Big Shrine"	3:19
9.	"At the Russian Consulate"	1:38
10.	"The Kubuki Theatre"	1:23
11.	"Jim Gets the 3rd Degree"	1:24
12.	"Newspaper Headline"	0:33
13.	"Hello Mamiko"	1:18
14.	"Mamiko Is Kidnapped"	0:58
15.	"Taro in the Hospital"	3:34
16.	"Steffi Cries"	2:15
17.	"Jim Gives Her a Gun"	1:25
18.	"Railroad Strike"	0:38
19.	"Mamiko Dies in Taro's Arms"	1:49
20.	"Taro Gets Caught"	1:25
21.	"Taro Commits Suicide"	1:05
22.	"End Title"	0:20

In addition to the above titles, "Oyedo Boogie" by Yasuo Shimizu and Shizuo Yoshikawa was also included. The soundtrack's LP record was released in 1987 under the Screen Archives Entertainment label.

== Bibliography ==
- Belli, Melvin Mouron; Kaiser, Robert Blair (1976). Melvin Belli: My Life on Trial: An Autobiography. New York: Morrow. ISBN 978-0-688-03085-8. OCLC 2151198.
- Kamei, Shunsuke (June 1981). "The Kiss and Japanese Culture after World War II". Comparative Literature Studies. 18 (2). Penn State University Press: 114–123. ISSN 0010-4132. JSTOR 40246247.
- King, James (2012). Under Foreign Eyes (eBook). Lanham, Maryland: O-Books. ISBN 978-1-78099-049-1. OCLC 779828016.
- Kitamura, Hiroshi (December 2009). "Hollywood's 'New' Orientalism: The case of Tokyo File 212 (1951)". Historical Journal of Film, Radio and Television. 29 (4). International Association for Media and History: 505–522. doi:10.1080/01439680903363248. ISSN 0143-9685. S2CID 194052454.
- Lentz, Robert J. (2003). Korean War Filmography. Jefferson, North Carolina: McFarland & Company. ISBN 978-0-7864-1046-0. OCLC 50630520.
- Motion pictures classified by National Legion of Decency. New York City: National Legion of Decency. 1959. OCLC 750484145.
- Rasmussen, Bjørn (1968). Filmens hvem-vad-hvor: Udenlanske film 1950–1967 [The Movies Who-What-Where: Foreign Movies 1950–1967] (in Danish). Vol. 3. Politiken. OCLC 928645048.
- Roan, Jeanette (2010). Envisioning Asia: On Location, Travel, and the Cinematic Geography of U.S. Orientalism. Ann Arbor, Michigan: University of Michigan Press. ISBN 978-0-472-05083-3. OCLC 671655107.
