= Moyuru ōzora =

1940 Japanese war movie

Moyuru ōzora (The Burning Sky)
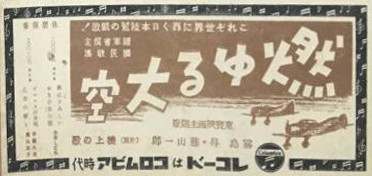
- Japanese movie poster for The Burning Sky.
- Directed by: Yutaka Abe
- Screenplay by: Yasutarō Yagi
- Based on: a story by Komatsu Kiyamura
- Produced by: Yutaka Abe
- Starring: Den Obinata, Ichiro Tsukita, Katsuhiko Haida
- Cinematography: Yoshio Miyajima
- Edited by: Toshio Goto
- Music by: Fumio Hayasaka
- Production company: Toho
- Release date: September 25, 1940
- Running time: 137 minutes
- Country: Japan
- Language: Japanese

The Burning Sky (Japanese: 燃ゆる大空, Hepburn: Moyuru ōzora) is a 1940 black-and-white Japanese war film produced and directed by Yutaka Abe, with special effects by Eiji Tsuburaya. The film depicts the growth and fighting style of Imperial Japanese Army Air Service officers as they undergo training, and later their interactions with their former instructor as they fight together in China during the Second Sino-Japanese War after he takes command of their squadron. Considered a work of high quality, The Burning Sky is ranked eighth in the Kinema Junpo list of Ten Best Japanese Films. Special cinematographer Eiichi (or Eiji) Tsuburaya won the Japan Photographers Association Award for his work on the film.

The theme song, also called "The Burning Sky," was composed by Kosaku Yamada and sung by Ichiro Fujiyama and was a hit song in Japan.

== Synopsis ==
Captain Yamamoto, an instructor at the Imperial Japanese Army's Kumagaya Army Flight School at Kumagaya, Japan, gives his energetic students rigorous training every day, and one after another, they go on to become full-fledged pilots in the Imperial Japanese Army Air Service. Two years later, in February 1938, Yamamoto himself goes to the front in China during the Second Sino-Japanese War as the commanding officer of a fighter squadron in North China and is reunited joyfully with his former students, who have become successful military aviators. Although one of Yamamoto's former students, Tanaka, already has been killed in action, the others remain active, Yukimoto and Yamamura flying in Yamamoto's fighter squadron and Sato in a bomber squadron commanded by Captain Nara. Almost as soon as Yamamoto takes command, Yamamura crash-lands in enemy-held territory, and Yukimoto makes a forced landing and rescues him. As the war intensifies, the aviators fight hard and continue to achieve great success, but the number of those who do not return home increases.

== Cast ==
- Captain Yamamoto...Den Obinata
- Yukimoto...Ichiro Tsukita
- Yamamura...Heihachiro "Henry" Okawa as Yamamura
- Sato...Katsuhiko Haida
- Weekly shift officer...Soji Kiyokawa
- Jinrei unit commander...Minoru Takada
- Surgeon general...Kazuo Hasegawa
- Captain Noto...Ichiro Ryuzaki
- Lieutenant Yokota...Toshio Miki
- Ensign Inaba...Jun Maki
- Instructor...Taizo Fukami
- Adjutant...Seishiro Hara
- Combat Team...Akira Nakamura, Eiichi Sha, Masanosuke Sawamura, Haruo Numata, Souji Shima, Sanpei Tani
- Captain Nara...Susumu Fujita
- Bomber squadron...Ryo Sayama, Ryutaro Nagai, Tokiichiro Osaki, Tetsuichiro, Susumu Osugi, Akira Kinoshita
- Mechanized soldiers...Hiroshi Yanagiya, Ryutaro Nagai, Tokiichiro Osaki, Tetsuichiro, Susumu Osugi, Akira Kinoshita, Satoshi Komori, Tomishiro Takeshita, Katsutaro Kimura
- Guard...Mitsuo Tsuda
- Students...Hideo Saito, Takenobu Kusumoto
- Also appearing: Yoji Misaki, Haruo Fujisawa, Hiroshi Yamakawa, Heikuro Imanari, Sen Yamabe, Isao Onizawa, Kinshiro Okubo, Hiroshi Tsukiji, Junichi Sugimoto, Ichiya Akai, Osamu Shindo

== Crew ==
- Special effects: Eiichi (or Eiji) Tsuburaya
- Art Director: Takeo Kita
- Lighting: Tsuruzo Nishikawa
- Sound: Isamu Suzuki

== Equipment appearing in the film ==
- Mitsubishi Ki-1 Army Type 93 heavy bomber
- Tachikawa Ki-9 Army Type 95-1 medium grade trainer (Allied name "Spruce")
- Kawasaki Ki-10 Army Type 95 fighter (Allied name "Perry")
- Mitsubishi Ki-21 Type 97 heavy bomber (Allied names "Gwen" and "Sally")
- Nakajima Ki-27 Type 97 fighter (Allied names "Nate" and "Abdul")
- Mitsubishi Ki-30 Type 97 light bomber (Allied name "Ann")
- Nakajima Ki-34 Army Type 97 transport (Allied name "Thora")
- Nakajima Army Type 91 fighter
- Toyota AA passenger sedan

== Production ==
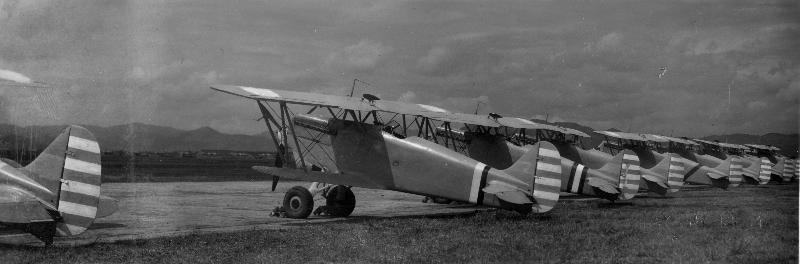
Imperial Japanese Army Air Service Kawasaki Ki-10 fighters in Republic of China Air Force markings for the filming of The Burning Sky. They portrayed Chinese Polikarpov I-15 fighters in the film.

Made to commemorate the 2,600th anniversary of the Imperial era in Japan in 1940, The Burning Sky took three years to film. The Japanese Army Ministry and Army Aviation Headquarters fully cooperated in the making of the film, and 947 real Imperial Japanese Army Air Service military aircraft in use during the Second Sino-Japanese War, as well as active air personnel, participated in the filming. In addition to a large number of what then were state-of-the-art Nakajima K-27 fighters and Mitsubishi Ki-21 heavy bombers, older Kawasaki Ki-10 fighters also appear in Chinese markings, portraying Polikarpov I-15 fighters of the Republic of China Air Force.

Director Yutaka Abe was skeptical of special effects, so he focused on real scenes, but some scenes lacked the impact he desired, so special effects scenes were added. However, most of the flight scenes were shot with actual aircraft actually flying for the movie, rather than using special effects or reusing existing film such as that of newsreels. In addition, a camera was installed in the cockpit of a Ki-27 fighter during training scenes depicting the strafing of targets at sea during flight school and during the dogfight scenes between Ki-27 and Ki-10 fighters, giving a sense of realism from the perspective of a fighter pilot. As a result, The Burning Sky ranks in terms of realism among Japanese films of the era in the same category as the 1942's Wings of Triumph and 1944's Kato hayabusa sento-tai ("Kato Hayabusa Combat Team").

For the crash-landing scene, a model airplane made of pasted-together construction paper was launched from a cliff with a slingshot while three cameras filmed the action from the bottom of the cliff, but the model airplane blew away in the wind. It was not seen again.

The early part of The Burning Sky depicts the training and life of young airmen at the Kumagaya Army Flight School in a realistic and sometimes humorous manner, and serves as an advertisement for military enlistment. The movie was unique even at the time in that no women appear in it. Kazuo Hasegawa appears in the role of a military doctor attached to the Army Air Service in order to attract a female audience.

== Theme song ==
The movie's theme song also was entitled "The Burning Sky." Sonosuke Sato wrote the lyrics, Kosaku Yamada composed the melody, and Tokio Niki arranged the song. Noboru Kirishima and Ichiro Fujiyama provided the vocals. Nippon Columbia released the song in May 1940. It was included in the 64th volume of the NHK radio program Kokumin Kayo ("National Song").

Sato's bright and lively lyrics and Yamada's sophisticated melody reminiscent of a German march gained popularity. As a movie theme song, it became a hit as a wartime military song alongside "Sora no Shinhei" ("Sky God Soldier"), a song about the Imperial Japanese Army's paratroopers, and many recordings of "The Burning Sky" were produced after World War II. On the record, a mixed chorus is added, and in the third verse, Fujiyama's singing voice is mixed with humming for added effect. On the other hand, a male chorus version is used in the beginning and end of the movie.

Later, Tatsunoko Production's 1971 television series Animation: Keizai used an instrumental version of "The Burning Sky" as background music. Baseball player Toru Nimura, who played for the Chunichi Dragons from 1984 to 1995, used the opening line of the song as his walk-up music.

External audio
- "The Burning Sky"
- "The Burning Sky", sung by Ichiro Fujiyama. YouTube art track provided by Nippon Columbia.

The copyright for the lyrics expired at the end of 1992, and the copyright for the song expired at the end of 2015, leaving both in the public domain. The lyrics are as follows:

The burning sky is a current of air.
The clouds are rising, they are flying.
The wings are shining like a swift wind, sounding true and maintaining their altitude.
Competing with the light, Aviation Japan, we conquer the skies.

The plane's wings are in turmoil, it's a storm, it's raining,
The sparkling propellers are the first to dedicate themselves to the empire,
Our brave and invincible wings.
We are the elite, our fighting spirit is inexhaustible.

Far above the ground, both in the south and in the north,
We attack and defend, fighting and bombing in every direction.
Say hello to the devil's wings on the front lines.
We conquer the skies of East Asia with the help of radio waves.

Open up the skies, hope, road, Seven Seas,
Conquer the continent, and advance through culture,
Let's say the wings of the Golden Goose in high spirits,
We, young people, will surpass the world and bear the prestige of our nation.
