= Ichimaru =

Japanese singer (1906-1997)

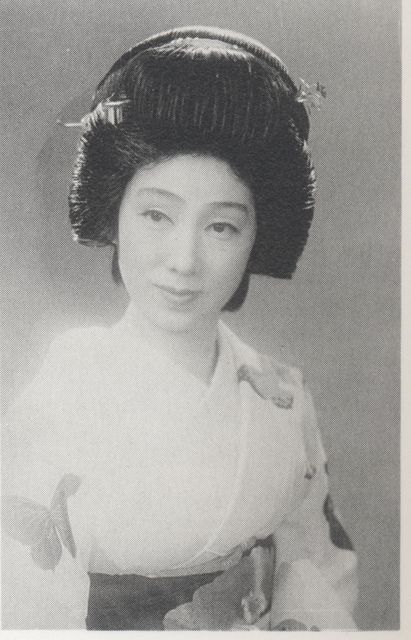

Background information
- Born: Matsue Gotō; July 16, 1906; Matsumoto, Nagano, Japan
- Died: February 17, 1997 (aged 90)
- Genres: Ryūkōka, Min'yō, Hauta, Kouta, Miyazono
- Occupations: geisha,singer
- Years active: 1931–1997

Ichimaru (市丸), born Matsue Goto (後藤 まつゑ, Gotō Matsue; July 16, 1906 – February 17, 1997), was a popular Japanese recording artist and geisha. Her rivalry with another popular geisha singer, Katsutaro Kouta, created the "Katsu-Ichi Era" in Japanese music history.

== Early life ==
Ichimaru grew up in Japan with 11 siblings under harsh conditions. She left her family at the age of 14 or 15 to work at a geisha house. Ichimaru spent much of her early years working at a hot springs spa in Asama Onsen, Matsumoto, as an ordinary geisha under the name of Chōchō (Butterfly). When Ichimaru was asked to sing by one of her customers, she was terribly embarrassed at her inability to sing; she vowed to improve her skills. At the age of 19, she moved to Tokyo and joined the Ichimatsuya okiya in Asakusa, continuing her geisha career under a new name, Ichimaru.

== Recording career ==
In an effort to improve her singing skills when she moved to Tokyo, Ichimaru undertook shamisen and singing lessons from Enchiga Kiyomoto, who was a famous female shamisen artist. She made great progress but still felt she could get better. Ichimaru then undertook training with the Grand Head Master Enjudaiyu Kiyomoto V's son, Eijudaiyu.

The training paid off and soon she was in great demand in not only her own geisha district but others around hers such as Yanagibashi, Akasaka and Shinbashi. Due to her great singing talent, Ichimaru was asked by The Victor Recording Company to sign a contract in 1931, along with another popular geisha singer, Katsutaro. She recorded her first song Chakkiri bushi (Picking tea song) which became a hit. Composed by a poet Kitahara Hakushu to promoted an amusement park. She followed her debut up with another hit, "Tenryū Kudareba" (Down the Tenryū River, 1933), which saw her become a superstar. Due to the success of her budding music career she decided to retire from being a geisha to concentrate solely on her singing career. The mid-1930s was called the "Katsu-Ichi Jidai" or "Ichi-Katsu Jidai" (“Katsu-Ichi Era” or “Ichi-Katsu Era”), when she and Katsutaro Kouta became big rivals over song and kimono styles and other issues, which sometimes caused problems.

Throughout the 1930s Ichimaru continued to record new songs and performed for Japanese troops at home and abroad. By the end of the decade her recording career had slowed down to a complete halt due to World War II. After the war in 1948 she began to record music again to boost the morale of post-war Japan. Her first song post-war was "Kurogami Romansu"(“Black Hair Romance”). At the end of the 1940s she started her own radio program called "Mitsukoshi Calendar of Songs" which would continue to be a success for the next ten years. After the war Ichimaru became interested in United States culture, becoming greatly interested in jazz music. The result of this interest was the hit song "Shamisen Boogie Woogie", composed with jazz songwriter Ryoichi Hattori. In 1950, she became the first Japanese singer after World War II to be invited to Hawaii to perform, along with Noboru Kirishima, Akiko Futaba and Masao Koga. This performance was followed by other international concerts. During this time Ichimaru was singing for kabuki, and composing her own ko-uta, a style that would later become known as "Ichimaru Air". She also had a brief role in the 1951 film Tokyo File 212. The appearance of television in Japan made Ichimaru an important guest for music programs. In 1968, with others singers from the 1930s era, she regularly appeared on "Natsukashi no Utagoe"(Nostalgic Songs). She continued to record song until 1985. Her last song was "Showa Sanosa Bushi" ("Sanosa Song of Showa"). She continued to appeared on television until she decided to retire in 1995.

== Teaching career ==
In 1984, Ichimaru founded the Edo Ko-uta Ichiju Society with the hopes of popularizing Edo ko-uta. She had an active role in training students in this style, and continued to teach well into 80s. She was also granted the title of Head Master of Nakamura School of Edo Ko-uta in 1960, due to her successful singing career and her support of the style.

== Legacy ==
Ichimaru died at the age of 90 in 1997, leaving a legacy of traditional folk music for modern day Japanese. Throughout her career she recorded 270 pieces of ha-uta, zokkyoku melodies and ko-uta, and won many prestigious awards including Geijutsusai Shorei Sho in 1970, Shiju Hoso (Imperial Order of the Purple Ribbon) in 1972 and Kun Yonto Zui-ho Sho (4th Imperial Order of the Sacred Treasure) in 1981.

Her legacy continues to live on in the form of a generous donation of kimono, obi and memorabilia by Mrs. Fumi Suzuki, a friend of Ichimaru, to the Art Gallery of Greater Victoria in Canada and also by donations given to the Iida Museum in Nagano. The May–June 2003 issue of the magazine Arts of Asia contained a 20 page article about Ichimaru, which included an eight-page spread dedicated to some of her kimono.
