= Jungle Stampede =

1950 film by George Breakston

- Theatrical release poster
- Directed by: George Breakston
- Screenplay by: Ronald Davidson
- Produced by: George Breakston; Yorke Coplen
- Starring: George Breakston; Yorke Coplen; Ronald Davidson; Herman Schopp; Stan Lawrence-Brown; Miguel Roginsky
- Cinematography: Herman Schopp
- Edited by: Philip Cahn; Sam Starr
- Production company: Republic Pictures
- Distributed by: Republic Pictures
- Release date: July 28, 1950
- Running time: 60 minutes
- Country: United States
- Language: English

Jungle Stampede is a 1950 American adventure film directed by George Breakston and written by Ronald Davidson. The film stars George Breakston, Yorke Coplen, Ronald Davidson, Herman Schopp, Stan Lawrence-Brown and Miguel Roginsky. The film was released on July 28, 1950, by Republic Pictures. It was condemned by the National Legion of Decency.

== Cast ==
- George Breakston as George Breakston
- Yorke Coplen as Yorke Coplen
- Ronald Davidson as Commentator
- Herman Schopp as Safari Cameraman
- Stan Lawrence-Brown as Safari Member
- Miguel Roginsky as Safari Member
