= Envisioning Asia =

2010 book by Jeanette Roan

Envisioning Asia: On Location, Travel, and the Cinematic Geography of U.S. Orientalism
- Front cover of Envisioning Asia
- Author: Jeanette Roan
- Language: English
- Publisher: Ann Arbor, University of Michigan Press
- Publication date: 2010
- Publication place: United States
- Pages: 266
- ISBN: 0-472-05083-4
- OCLC: 466344551

Envisioning Asia: On Location, Travel, and the Cinematic Geography of U.S. Orientalism is a 2010 American book written by Jeanette Roan, about Asian Americans in Hollywood films. It also discusses the "on location" shooting of Hollywood films in Asia. It was published by University of Michigan Press.

== Background ==
Jeanette Roan is an associate professor of Visual Studies & Visual and Critical Studies at California College of the Arts, Oakland, California.

== Content ==
Roan begins her book with a discussion about the feature film The Good Earth (1937). In the publicity for the film it was claimed that viewing the film once was equal to all that a person would come to know and experience from a whole year's journey in China. However, the film was actually shot in San Fernando Valley.

Roan goes on to discuss Elias Burton Holmes, an expert who gave lectures on topics including "The Hawaiian Islands" and "The Forbidden City", which depicted the Chinese, Philippine and inhabitants of Pacific islands.

The portrayal of Asians in American films and the images they created in the minds of the audience are discussed. Analysis of "on-location shooting" of films from the last decade of the nineteenth century to 1960s is presented. She views that the concept of imperialism has changed into that of democracy and globalism. Thomas Edison's Occidental and Oriental Series has also been critically analyzed. Alterations brought by the Spanish–American War, the Philippine–American War, and the Boxer Uprising in the depiction of Asian Americans is also discussed.

A final chapter focuses on the consequences that the Occupation of Japan had on Hollywood films. The usage of Japan as a shooting spot has been discussed by citing the examples of Tokyo File 212 (1951), Three Stripes in the Sun (1955), Teahouse of the August Moon (1956), Sayonara (1957), and My Geisha (1962).

In her conclusion, Roan analyses David Cronenberg's M. Butterfly (1993), shot on location in Hungary, China, France, and Canada, and posits her reasons for the negative reception of the feature. She states that the previous Hollywood films shot in China showed the country's scenic beauty and tourist attractions to their audiences, but Cronenberg, contrary to the expectations of film viewers, focused more on the characters, narrative, and story. A few contemporary critics questioned the need for location shooting in China.

== Reception ==
Monica Rico wrote in the journal Film & History that "Envisioning Asia deserves to be widely read and assigned" and that the author relies "perhaps a bit too heavily on quotations" from others. Kent A. Ono (in American Quarterly) opined that Roan had "[emphasized] context itself", taking a cultural studies approach to her study of “on location” cinema and concluded by saying that "Roan questions the very need and rationale for the authenticity that location shooting ostensibly allows and provides."

== Bibliography ==
- Ono, Kent A. (2012). ""Lines of Flight": Reterritorializing Asian American Film and Media Studies". American Quarterly. 64 (4): 885–897. doi:10.1353/aq.2012.0051. ISSN 1080-6490. S2CID 144755827.
- Rico, Monica (2012). "Envisioning Asia: On Location, Travel, and the Cinematic Geography of U.S. Orientalism (review)". Film & History: An Interdisciplinary Journal of Film and Television Studies. 42 (1): 46–47. doi:10.1353/flm.2012.0014. ISSN 1548-9922. S2CID 143489225.
- Roan, Jeanette (2010). Envisioning Asia: On Location, Travel, and the Cinematic Geography of U.S. Orientalism. University of Michigan Press. doi:10.3998/mpub.327161. ISBN 978-0-472-02706-4. JSTOR 10.3998/mpub.327161 – via Project MUSE.
- Wu, Y. (December 2010). "Roan, Jeanette. Envisioning Asia: On Location, Travel, and the Cinematic Geography of U.S. Orientalism". Choice: Current Reviews for Academic Libraries. 48 (4): 691 – via Gale General OneFile.
