= Heihachiro Okawa =

Japanese actor (1905–1971)

- 大川 平八郎
- Born: 9 September 1905
- Died: 27 May 1971 (aged 65)
- Other names: Ōkawa Heihachirō, Henry Okawa
- Occupation: Actor

Heihachiro Okawa (Japanese: 大川 平八郎, Hepburn: Ōkawa Heihachirō; 9 September 1905 – 27 May 1971), also credited as Henry Okawa (ヘンリー大川), was a Japanese film actor active from the 1930s to 1971.

With hopes of starting a business, Okawa traveled to the United States in 1923 and studied at Columbia University. He also studied at the Paramount Studios acting school and eventually began working in Hollywood, appearing in films by Howard Hawks and William Wellman. He returned to Japan in 1933 and co-starred in the Photo Chemical Laboratories (PCL) film Horoyoi jinsei. He later appeared in foreign films, and worked as an interpreter on sets, under the name Henry Okawa.

He is best known for Moyuru ōzora (1940), Dawn of Freedom (1944) Tokyo File 212 (1951), Floating Clouds (1955) and The Bridge on the River Kwai (1957).

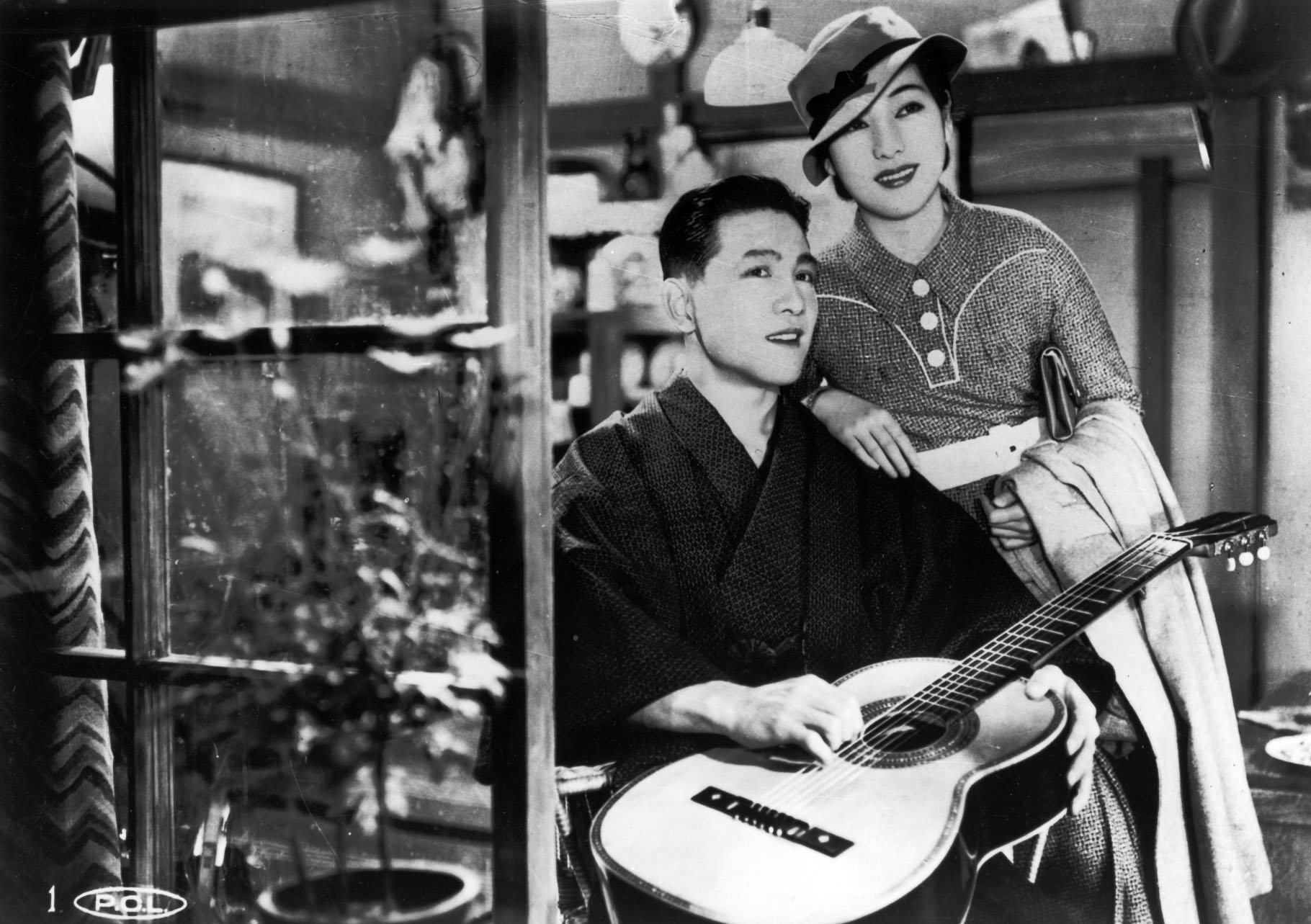
Okawa with Sachiko Chiba in Wife! Be Like a Rose! (1935)

== Partial filmography ==
- The Air Circus (1929)
- Ongaku kigeki horoyoi jinsei (1933) - Asao
- Junjô no miyako (1933)
- Sakura Ondo - namida no haha (1934)
- Odoriko nikki (1934)
- Namiko no isshô (1934)
- Arupusu taishô (1934)
- Kinu no dorogutsu (1935)
- Three Sisters With Maiden Hearts (1935) - Aoyama
- Wife! Be Like a Rose! (1935) - Seiji, Kimiko's boyfriend
- Saakasu goningumi (1935) - Kokichi
- The Girl in the Rumor (1935) - Shintaro
- Ani imôto (1936) - Student, Obata
- Kimi to yuku michi (1936) - Asaji Amanuma
- Ren'ai no sekinin (1936)
- Ashita no namikimichi (1936) - Ogawa
- Nyonin aishû (1937)
- Nampû no oka (1937)
- Hokushi no sora wo tsuku (1937)
- Kafuku zempen (1937)
- Kafuku kôhen (1937)
- Tetsuwan toshi (1938)
- Jinsei keiba (1938)
- Tsuruhachi Tsurujirô (1938) - Matsuzaki
- Gekka no wakamusha (1938)
- Rônin fubuki (1939) - Gengo Ôtaka
- Higuchi Ichiyo (1939)
- Nonki Yokocho (1939)
- Shimai no Yakusoku (1940)
- Ungetsu no Kudan no haha (1940)
- Totsugu hi made (1940)
- Onna no machi (1940) - Shinjiro Ine's husband
- Shanhai no tsuki (1941) - Takeshi Yoshino
- Warau chikyû ni asa ga kuru (1942)
- The Sky of Hope (1942) - Okada
- Matte ita otoko (1942)
- Nankai no hanataba (1942) - Harada, pilot
- Tsubasa no gaika (1942)
- Ano hata o ute (1944)
- Tokyo File 212 (1951)
- Oriental Evil (1951)
- Dancing Girl (1951) – Koyama
- Shanghai gaeri no Lil (1952) - Takada
- Asa no hamon (1952)
- Geisha Girl (1952) - Police Inspector
- Eagle of the Pacific (1953)
- Watashi no subete o (1954)
- Doyoubi no tenshi (1954)
- Yurei otoko (1954)
- Floating Clouds (1955) - Isha
- Ai no rekishi (1955) - Clerk
- Three Stripes in the Sun (1955) - Father Yoshida
- The Bridge on the River Kwai (1957) - Captain Kanematsu
- Stopover Tokyo (1957) - Lt. Afumi (uncredited)
- The Mysterians (1957) - Person at Board Meeting
- The Wind Cannot Read (1958) - Lt. Nakamura
- Songoku: The Road to the West (1959)
- The Big Wave (1961) - Yukio's Father
- Marines, Let's Go (1961) - Yoshida (hotel manager)
- Chūshingura: Hana no Maki, Yuki no Maki (1962) - Kyûdayû Mase
- Kokusai himitsu keisatsu: shirei dai hachigo (1963) - Quyen
- Ghidorah, the Three-Headed Monster (1964) - Astronomer
- Destroy All Monsters (1968) - Engineer
- Hændeligt uheld (1971) - Kawasaki (final film role)
