= African Patrol =

British TV adventure series (1958–1959)

- Genre: Adventure; Police procedural
- Created by: George Breakston
- Directed by: George Breakston
- Starring: John Bentley
- Country of origin: United Kingdom
- Original language: English
- No. of seasons: 1
- No. of episodes: 39

Production
- Producers: George Breakston; Jack J. Gross; Philip N. Krasne
- Running time: 25 minutes (approx)
- Production companies: Kenya Productions Ltd./Gross-Krasne, Inc.

Original release
- Network: Syndication
- Release: 5 April 1958 – 22 March 1959

African Patrol is a 39-episode syndicated adventure television series created, directed and produced by George Breakston in conjunction with Jack J. Gross and Philip N. Krasne. It was filmed on location in Kenya for a period of 15 months beginning in January 1957.

== Plot ==
The series relates the adventures of the African Patrol, a unit of police officers based in Nairobi. Paul Derek is an inspector in the unit whose members are specially trained to investigate crime. Their telephone number is 1356.

== Cast ==
- John Bentley as Inspector Paul Derek
- Tony Blane as Parker
- Glynn Davies as Lt. Greer

== Background ==
Many independent American television production companies shot their series outside the United States in the 1950s. Not only did this give audiences a chance to see new locations not shot in a studio but costs were much cheaper, especially as these runaway productions did not have to pay residuals or pay American film union wages.

In the 1950s a genre of American television series set in Africa were so popular and prolific they were nicknamed the "Straw Hut Circuit". Unlike most series that were filmed in the United States and used stock footage of African fauna taken on safari, African Patrol was filmed on location in Kenya.

Producer and director George Breakston moved to Kenya in the early 1950s filming several safari adventure feature films such as The Scarlet Spear, Golden Ivory, Escape in the Sun and The Woman and the Hunter. Many of these featured John Bentley. Breakston also filmed another series in Kenya The Adventures of a Jungle Boy (1957) also in collaboration with American television producers Jack J. Gross and Philip N. Krasne.

== Episodes ==
The Baboon Laughed (5 April 1958)
The Hunt (19 April 1958)
Bodango Gold (26 April 1958)
Lost (3 May 1958)
The Accident (10 May 1958)
The Duel (17 May 1958)
Murder is Spelled L.O.V.E. (24 May 1958)
The Bad Samaritan (31 May 1958)
Hooded Death (8 June 1958)
Shooting Star (15 June 1958)
No Science (22 June 1958)
Heart of Gold (29 June 1958)
Counterfeit (6 July 1958)
Mombasa (13 July 1958)
Tycoon (20 July 1958)
Hashish (27 July 1958)
Knife of Aesculapius (10 August 1958)
Killer from the Forest (17 August 1958)
Breakout (24 August 1958)

The Girl (31 August 1958)
Missing Doctor (7 September 1958)
Dead Shot (14 September 1958)
The Abduction (21 September 1958)
The Silver Story (28 September 1958)
Black Ivory (5 October 1958)
The Robbery (12 October 1958)
No Place To Hide (26 October 1958)
The Mortimer Touch (2 November 1958)
Shadowed Light (16 November 1958)
Ghost Country (30 November 1958)
The Sickness (14 December 1958)
Snake in the Grass (28 December 1958)
The Speculator (11 January 1959)
Hell Hath No Fury (25 January 1959)
The Trek (8 February 1959)
Knave of Diamonds (22 February 1959)
Witness to Murder (8 March 1959)
The Deadly 20 Minutes (22 March 1959)
