= Schopp (surname) =

Schopp is a surname. Notable people with the surname include:

- Herman Schopp (1899–1954), Austrian cinematographer
- Markus Schopp (born 1974), Austrian footballer

== See also ==
- Schöpp

Why do you think this is a good site like opp
