= Princess Kaguya (1935 film) =

1935 film directed by Yoshitsugu Tanaka

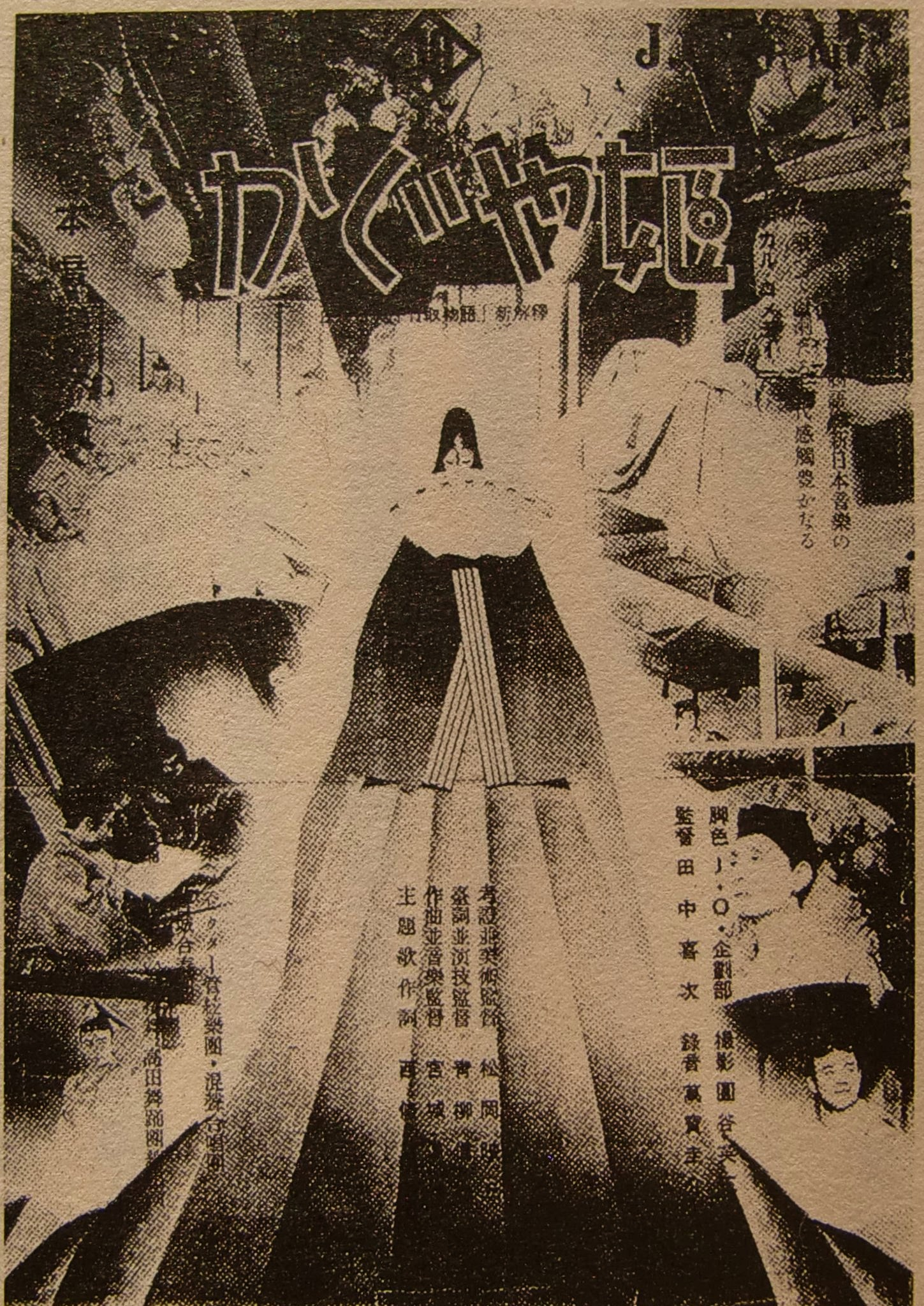
- Theatrical release poster

Japanese name
- Kanji: かぐや姫
Transcriptions
- Revised Hepburn: Kaguya Hime
- Directed by: Yoshitsugu Tanaka
- Special effects by: Eiji Tsuburaya
- Screenplay by: J.O. Planning Department
- Based on: The Tale of the Bamboo Cutter
- Starring: Kazuko Kitazawa; Yō Shiomi; Hideko Higashi; Ichirō Fujiyama; Dekao Yokoo; Tamaki Tokuyama
- Cinematography: Eiji Tsuburaya
- Music by: Michio Miyagi
- Production company: J.O. Studios
- Distributed by: Towa Shoji Film Club
- Release date: November 21, 1935 (Japan)
- Running time: 75 minutes 33 minutes (shortened version)
- Country: Japan
- Language: Japanese

Princess Kaguya (Japanese: かぐや姫, Hepburn: Kaguya Hime) (Note: Also known as Princess of the Moon.) is a 1935 Japanese musical drama film directed by Yoshitsugu Tanaka, with cinematography and special effects by Eiji Tsuburaya. Produced by J.O. Studios (later Toho), it is based on the 10th century Japanese literary tale The Tale of the Bamboo Cutter. In the film, Princess Kaguya was raised by a couple who spread rumors that she had ascended a mountain in order to deceive suitors and ran away with her son and the princess. The film was considered lost until the British Film Institute found a 35mm cut in May 2015. (Note: Attributed to multiple references:)

== Plot ==
The plot follows the narrative of The Tale of the Bamboo Cutter.

== Cast ==
- Kazuko Kitazawa as Princess Kaguya
- Yō Shiomi as Okina
- Hideko Higashi as Ōna, Okina's wife
- Ichirō Fujiyama as Zomaro
- Dekao Yokoo as the Prime Minister
- Tamaki Tokuyama as Tamaro, the Prime Minister's son
- Kinji Fujiwa as Hosomi, the Prime Minister's son
- Hyō Kitazawa

== Production ==
=== Special effects ===
Famed special effects director Eiji Tsuburaya worked on the film's effects, which are regarded as a major advancement in Japanese visual effects. They are described as follows: "Tsuburaya used special effects and multiple exposures to make it appear as though the Princess Kaguya was glowing inside of a bamboo shoot as the centuries-old tale states, with projections and more for the moon and sky effects. Certain parallels in the effects can be found between and the 1927 German film Metropolis, although the effects showcased in the brief public clip do showcase unique ideas not found in the earlier production." Miniatures and synthetic techniques were used to recreate the town of Kyoto.

Kenzō Masaoka supervised the miniature effects for the film. He would later recall in Kinema Junpo: "We tried to create our own frame-by-frame shots for the oxcarts, which I think was the first time this [technique] was attempted in Japan. We shot about ten plaster figures of oxen in various stages of movement, and then animated them by replacing these static models frame-by-frame. These plaster figures were the masterpieces of Takefu Asano, and took a period of more than one month to sculpt."

== Release ==
The Japan Association of London organized a screening in 1936 for local subsidiaries, and requested the Embassy of Japan to "prepare a film about Japanese myths and legends." In addition to not having a screening record since its release, the location of the film was also unknown. The British Film Institute (BFI) received information in May 2015 regarding a flammable positive film of the film. A researcher at the National Film Archive investigated the film at the BFI Preservation Center in October of the same year and determined that it was a shortened version of the film. The shortened version of the film was released in Japan on September 4, 2021, after negotiations with the BFI for six years.

== See also ==
- List of rediscovered films
