= Golden Ivory =

1954 film

- US Film poster by Albert Kallis
- Directed by: George Breakston
- Written by: Dermot Quinn
- Produced by: John Croydon; George Breakston; C. Ray Stahl
- Starring: Robert Urquhart; John Bentley; Susan Stephen
- Cinematography: John Lawrence
- Edited by: Ted Obolensky
- Music by: Phillip Green
- Production company: Summit Films
- Distributed by: Associated British-Pathé; American International Pictures (US)
- Release date: 5 December 1954
- Running time: 89 minutes
- Country: United Kingdom
- Language: English

Golden Ivory is a 1954 British adventure film shot in Kenya. It was directed by George P. Breakston and starred Robert Urquhart, John Bentley and Susan Stephen. The film was shot in Eastmancolor with prints by Technicolor. Released in colour in the United States as Outlaw Safari, it was later released as White Huntress in black and white.

== Background ==
The film is set in the 1890s and is centered on British pioneer settlers in Kenya. In 1957, exploitation film specialists of American International Pictures acquired the rights as the studio's first foreign made feature film, retitled it White Huntress and released it in an edited black and white movie as a double feature with a shockumentary Naked Africa.

John Bentley later had the lead in the African Patrol television series that was produced by George Breakston and shot in Kenya.

== Plot ==
Jim and Paul Dobson are a pair of brothers who are White Hunters in 1890 British East Africa. Paul seeks to make his fortune by finding the location of an elephants' graveyard a friend told him about before he died. The penniless pair decide to get near the location and get a wagon by hiring themselves out to protect and hunt game for a wagon train of settlers heading for Blood Mountain in the land of the Masai. Paul fools their party by taking them on a more dangerous route in order to locate the ivory of the graveyard. En route they pick up Mr Seth a prospector who is vague about the whereabouts of his fellow prospectors. The party faces danger from both the local fauna and natives.

== Cast ==
- Robert Urquhart as Jim Dobson
- John Bentley as Paul Dobson
- Susan Stephen as Ruth Meecham
- Alan Tarlton as Mr. Seth
- Howarth Wood as Thomas Meecham
- Morea Soutter as Catherine Johnson
- Tom Lithgow as Peter Johnson
- Maureen Connell as Liz Johnson
- Reginald Smart as Captain Mann
- Kip Kamoi as Maasai Chief
