= Urubu (film) =

- Theatrical release poster
- Directed by: George P. Breakston; Yorke Coplen
- Screenplay by: Patrick Whyte
- Story by: George P. Breakston
- Produced by: George P. Breakston; Yorke Coplen
- Starring: George P. Breakston; Yorke Coplen
- Cinematography: George P. Breakston; Yorke Coplen
- Edited by: Holbrook N. Todd
- Music by: Albert Glasser
- Production company: World Adventures
- Distributed by: United Artists
- Release date: September 24, 1948
- Running time: 66 minutes
- Country: United States
- Language: English

Urubu is a 1948 American adventure film directed by George P. Breakston and Yorke Coplen, written by Patrick Whyte, and starring George P. Breakston and Yorke Coplen. The film was released on September 24, 1948, by United Artists.

== Cast ==
- George P. Breakston as George
- Yorke Coplen as Narrator
