= Gloria Saunders =

American actress

Gloria Ella Saunders
- Born: September 29, 1927
- Died: June 4, 1980 (aged 52)
- Occupations: Actress of film and television
- Years active: 1946–1960

Gloria Ella Saunders (September 29, 1927 – June 4, 1980) was an American actress of film and television, primarily from the late 1940s to 1960.

== Career ==
Saunders acting career began on stage. She was discovered when she performed in a production of Rebecca in the southern United States, after which she acted in a San Francisco production of Adam Ate His Apple.

Saunders appeared as a radio operator in the war film O.S.S. (1946) and in the Columbia Pictures film Red Snow (1952), and she portrayed Zelda in the Columbia production Prisoners of the Casbah (1953).

She made many television appearances including Adventures of Superman s1e20, "The Riddle of the Chinese Jade."

== Personal life ==
Gloria Saunders was the daughter of George Dewey Saunders, and the mother of Lexey Cosentino. At the time of her death she was married to Roy J. Maier.
