= Lee Frederick =

American actor

Lee Frederick (June 2, 1912 – June 6, 1993) also credited as Robert Peyton) was an American film actor active during the 1950s. He played the lead character of an intelligence officer in the 1951 espionage thriller Tokyo File 212 opposite Florence Marly. Critic Robert J. Lentz called his performance "solid".

== Filmography ==
Year	Title	Role	Notes
1937	S.O.S. Coast Guard	Citizen	Serial, Uncredited
1939	Daredevils of the Red Circle	Bob	Serial, Uncredited
1939	Thunder Afloat	Sailor	Uncredited
1946	Nocturne	Attendant	Uncredited
1946	Criminal Court	Kellogg	Uncredited
1946	Dick Tracy vs. Cueball	Purser	Uncredited
1946	The Falcon's Adventure	Miami Policeman	Uncredited
1946	It's a Wonderful Life		Uncredited
1947	The Devil Thumbs a Ride		Uncredited
1947	Born to Kill	Desk Clerk	Uncredited
1947	Banjo	Policeman	Uncredited
1947	Desperate	Joe Daly	
1947	They Won't Believe Me	Detective	Uncredited
1947	Under the Tonto Rim	Hostler Ed	Uncredited
1948	If You Knew Susie	Reporter	Uncredited
1948	Train to Alcatraz	Collins	Uncredited
1948	The Babe Ruth Story	Catcher	Uncredited
1950	Border Treasure	Henchman Del	
1950	Between Midnight and Dawn	Officer Zeigler	Uncredited
1950	The Sun Sets at Dawn	Blackie	
1950	Kansas Raiders	Union Corporal	Uncredited
1951	Tokyo File 212	Jim Carter	
1951	FBI Girl	Barnes	Uncredited
1952	Night Stage to Galveston	T. J. Wilson	Uncredited
1952	Red Snow	Major Bennett	
1962	Womanhunt		
1983	Suburbia	Jim Tripplett	(final film role)
