= Schöpp =

Schöpp or Schoepp is a surname. Notable people with the surname include:

- Andrea Schöpp (born 1965), German female curler, Olympic and World champion
- Elinore Schöpp, German female curler
- Jie Schöpp (born 1968), Chinese-born, German international table tennis player
- Rainer Schöpp (born 1958), German male curler and coach
- Trapper Schoepp, American singer-songwriter

== See also ==
- Schopp (surname)
