= Nihon Ukulele Association =

Japanese association for ukulele players

The Nihon Ukulele Association (Japanese: 日本ウクレレ協会) is a Japanese association for ukulele players. It was founded in 1959 by Yukihiko Haida, a Hawaiian-born nisei who moved to Japan at a young age.

With his brother, Katsuhiko Haida, Haida formed the Moana Glee Club in 1929, but anti-Western sentiments from Japanese authority ended that association. Following World War II, Haida met Herb Ohta, an American Marine stationed in Japan, and a serious ukulele player. This discovery affirmed Haida's interest in the ukulele, and influenced him to form the Association.

== Sources ==
- Jim Beloff. The Ukulele: A Visual History Backbeat Books, 2003. ISBN 0-87930-758-7, ISBN 978-0-87930-758-5, page 110.
