= Geisha Girl (film) =

1952 Film directed by George Breakston

- Theatrical release poster
- Directed by: George Breakston, C. Ray Stahl
- Written by: C. Ray Stahl
- Screenplay by: C. Ray Stahl
- Produced by: George Breakston, C. Ray Stahl
- Starring: Steve Forrest, Martha Hyer, Tetsu Nakamura, Heihachirō Ōkawa, Dekao Yokoo
- Cinematography: Ichirō Hoshijima
- Music by: Albert Glasser
- Production company: Breakston-Stahl Productions
- Distributed by: Realart Pictures
- Release date: May 2, 1952 (United States)
- Running time: 67 minutes
- Country: United States
- Language: English

Geisha Girl is a 1952 American adventure film directed and produced by George Breakston and C. Ray Stahl and starring Steve Forrest, Martha Hyer, Tetsu Nakamura, Heihachirō Ōkawa and Dekao Yokoo. The film was shot in Tokyo, Japan. The plot was written to educate Western viewers about Japanese traditions such as a Kabuki theater presentation, a Buddhist religious ceremony and a geisha house.

== Plot ==
American soldiers Rocky Wilson and Archie McGregor, fighting in the Korean War, are granted leave in Tokyo. They want to visit nightclubs and bars, but as GIs are denied entrance, they purchase civilian clothing on the black market. Archie discovers strange pills in the suit jacket, and the sales clerk wants to cancel the deal, but they are interrupted by the military police. Rocky and Archie are trailed to a bar where powerful gang leader Mr. Nakano invites them to visit his home, mentioning that there is a geisha school there.

Rocky and Archie are accompanied by stewardess Peggy Barnes, who is actually a government spy trying to find the mysterious pills because they are very powerful explosives, more dangerous than a nuclear bomb. Nakano, assisted by his henchmen and some geisha, tries to wrest the pills from Archie but fails because geisha girl Michiko informs Peggy, and Peggy notifies the police. The police captain involves Zoro, a powerful hypnotist. The gangsters continue to pursue the pills, but Zoro finally manages to subdue them. Rocky and Archie are left in Peggy's custody.

== Cast ==
- Steve Forrest as Rocky Wilson
- Martha Hyer as Peggy Burnes
- Archer MacDonald as Archie MacGregor
- Tetsu Nakamura as Tetsu Nakano
- Heihachirō Ōkawa as Police Inspector
- Dekao Yokoo as Zoro
- Michiyo Naoki as Michiko
- Ralph Nagara as Betto

== See also ==
- List of American films of 1952
