= Red Snow (1952 film) =

1952 film by Boris Petroff and Harry S. Franklin

- Directed by: Boris Petroff; Harry S. Franklin
- Screenplay by: Tom Hubbard; Orville H. Hampton
- Based on: Robert Peters (based on a story)
- Produced by: Boris Petroff
- Starring: Guy Madison; Ray Mala; Carole Mathews; Gloria Saunders; Robert Peyton
- Narrated by: William Shaw
- Cinematography: Paul Ivano
- Edited by: Merrill G. White
- Music by: Alex Alexander; June Starr
- Production company: All American Film Corporation
- Distributed by: Columbia Pictures
- Release date: July 7, 1952
- Running time: 75 minutes
- Country: United States
- Language: English

Red Snow is a 1952 American adventure film directed by Boris Petroff and Harry S. Franklin and starring Guy Madison, Mala, Carole Mathews, Gloria Saunders and Lee Frederick. The film's action takes place in Alaska. It was part of a string of anti-communist films made around this time.

== Plot ==
Lieutenant Johnson, a U.S. Air Force pilot, on the tip of Alaska, a few miles from the Bering Straits from Siberia, helps foil a Soviet plot to test a few secret weapon by loyal Alaskan Eskimos. He is aided by Sergeant Koovuk, an Alaska native Eskimo also in the U.S. military service. Along the way there is an ice-floe evacuation, an air-ice rescue and a fight with a polar bear.

== Cast ==
- Guy Madison as Lt. Phil Johnson
- Mala as Sgt. Koovuk (as Ray Mala)
- Carole Mathews as Lt. Jane (as Carole Matthews)
- Gloria Saunders as Alak
- Lee Frederick as Major Bennett (as Robert Peyton)
- John Bryant as Enemy Pilot Alex
- Richard Vath as Maj. Elia
- Philip Ahn as Tuglu, the spy (as Phillip Ahn)
- Tony Benroy as Cpl. Savick
- Gordon Barnes as Capt. Mack MacLoflin
- John Bleifer as Commissar Volgan
- Gene Roth as Colonel Duboff
- Muriel Maddox as Nurse Ruth
- Robert Bice as Chief Nanu
- Renny McEvoy as Sgt. Spike Koops
- Bert Arnold as Riggs
- Richard Emory as Lt. Stone
- Dick Pinner as Long (as Richard Pinner)
- George Pembroke as Maj. Slavin
- Robert Carson as Debriefing General
- William Fletcher as Kresnick
- Richard Barron as Russian Officer

== See also ==
- List of American films of 1952

== Bibliography ==
- Phillip L. Gianos. Politics and Politicians in American Film. Greenwood Publishing Group, 1999.
