= Naked Africa =

- Film poster
- Directed by: Ray Phoenix
- Produced by: Cedric Worth
- Production company: Jaywall Productions
- Distributed by: American International Pictures
- Release date: 1957
- Country: United States
- Language: English

Naked Africa is a 1957 American Mondo documentary film about Africa released under the pretense of being an educational ethnographic film. It was released on a double bill with White Huntress. The film was later re-rereleased under the title Mondo Africana to exploit the shockumentaries Mondo Cane and Africa Addio.

== See also ==
- List of American films of 1957
- Nudity in film
