= Yukihiko Haida =

- Born: April 24, 1909; Honolulu
- Died: October 16, 1986 (aged 77)
- Citizenship: American, Japan
- Occupations: Actor, singer, film producer
- Relatives: Katsuhiko Haida (brother)

Yukihiko Harry Haida (灰田 有紀彦, Haida Yukihiko; April 24, 1909 – October 16, 1986) was a composer, ukulele player and steel guitarist. He and his brother Katsuhiko Haida founded the Nihon Ukulele Association.

== Early life and education ==
Haida was born in Honolulu on 24 April 1909, to parents who were Japanese immigrants to Hawaii. In 1923, while in Japan to place his late father's ashes in the family grave, Haida was caught up in the chaos after the 1923 Great Kanto earthquake, during which his family home was burgled and his passport was stolen. Being unable to return to Hawaii, Haida enrolled in Dokkyo Junior and Senior High School in Tokyo. He later studied for a while at Chuo University and Keio University, leaving the latter without graduating.

== Career ==
In 1928 Haida formed the Moana Glee Club, a Hawaiian music group, with his younger brother Katsuhiko Haida. The band popularized the ukulele in Japan. In 1933 Haida temporarily returned to Hawaii to study with M.K. Moke.

Haida began writing and arranging songs, and taught guitar in Koenji, Tokyo in 1935. Some of his students included Fumimaro Konoe's daughter and Kaneko Kentaro's grandchild. He signed with Victor Records and began recording and publishing music. During this time, Haida wrote songs like Suzukaze no Michi, which became a hit when Katsuhiko sang it. The band was active until World War II, when Western music, including Hawaiian music, were banned in 1943.

After the war Haida and Katsuhiko formed a band called the New Moana. They started the Nihon Ukulele Association in 1959.

In 1979 Haida was honored for his career and achievements at the 21st Japan Record Awards.
