= Three Sisters with Maiden Hearts =

1935 Japanese film

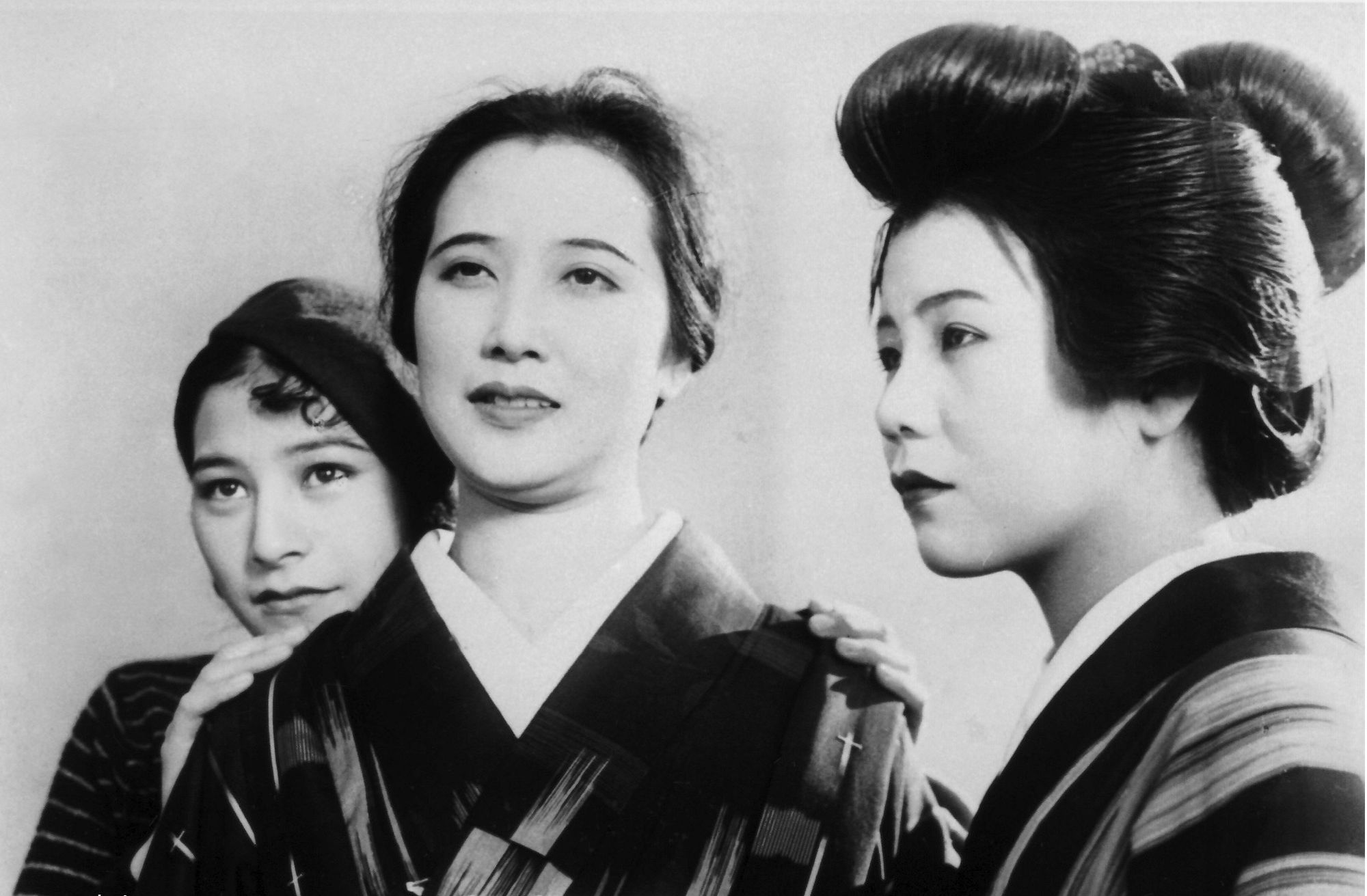

Japanese name
- Kanji: 乙女ごころ三人姉妹
- Directed by: Mikio Naruse
- Written by: Mikio Naruse; Yasunari Kawabata (story)
- Starring: Chikako Hosokawa; Masako Tsutsumi; Ryuko Umezono
- Cinematography: Hiroshi Suzuki
- Edited by: Kōichi Iwashita
- Music by: Kyōsuke Kami
- Production company: P.C.L.
- Distributed by: P.C.L.
- Release date: 1 March 1935 (Japan)
- Running time: 75 minutes
- Country: Japan
- Language: Japanese

Three Sisters with Maiden Hearts (Japanese: 乙女ごころ三人姉妹, romanized: Otome-gokoro sannin shimai) is a 1935 Japanese drama film written and directed by Mikio Naruse. Based on the short story Sisters of Asakusa (浅草の姉妹, Asakusa no shimai) by Yasunari Kawabata, it was the director's first sound film.

== Plot ==
O-Ren, O-Some and Chieko are the daughters of a hardened, middle-aged woman who runs a business of shamisen players, earning their money on their nightly rounds in bars in Asakusa. While O-Some still works in her mother's business, Chieko, her younger sister, is a nightclub dancer. O-Ren, the eldest, tries to settle for a domestic life with her boyfriend Kosugi in an attempt to escape the half-world she has been associated with. In need of money, O-Ren lures Aoyama (unaware that he is Chieko's boyfriend) into an apartment, where her gangster friends threaten him. O-Some, who witnesses the crime, is hurt with a knife when she interferes to help Aoyama. Although she knows of O-Ren's scheme, O-Some bids her sister and Kosugi good-bye at the train station. Left alone in pain in the waiting room, O-Some murmurs, "that turned out good".

== Cast ==
- Chikako Hosokawa as O-Ren, the eldest sister
- Masako Tsutsumi as O-Some, the middle sister
- Ryuko Umezono as Chieko, the youngest sister
- Chitose Hayashi as the mother
- Chisato Matsumoto as O-Haru
- Masako Sanjo as O-Shima
- Mariyo Matsumoto as O-Kinu
- Heihachirō Ōkawa as Aoyama, Chieko's boyfriend
- Osamu Takizawa as Kosugi, O-Ren's boyfriend

== Background ==
Three Sisters with Maiden Hearts was Naruse's first film for the P.C.L. film studio (later Toho) after his move from Shochiku. Naruse would remain affiliated with P.C.L./Toho for the rest of his professional career until 1967. In 1954, he adapted another work by Kawabata with his film Sound of the Mountain.

== Legacy ==
Three Sisters with Maiden Hearts was shown in the U.S. as part of a Naruse retrospective in 1985, organised by the Kawakita Memorial Film Institute and film scholar Audie Bock.

== Bibliography ==
- Kawabata, Yasunari (1934). 抒情歌 ('Lyrical song', short story collection containing 'Sisters of Asakusa' and 7 other stories). Tokyo: 竹村書房 (Takemura Shobo).
- Kawabata, Yasunari (2006). 夕映え少女 ('Evening girl', short story collection containing 'Sisters of Asakusa'). Kokubunji, Tokyo: 新風舎文庫 (Singpoosha). ISBN 978-4-28950001-7.
