= Yutaka Abe =

Japanese film director and actor

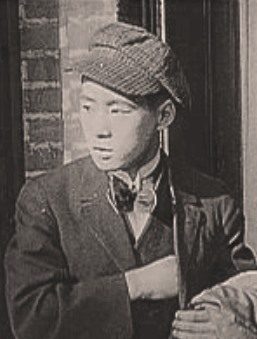
- As seen in The Golden Chance (1915)
- Born: February 2, 1895; Yamoto, Miyagi, Japan
- Died: January 3, 1977 (aged 81); Kyoto, Japan
- Occupations: Actor; Film director
- Years active: 1915–

Yutaka Abe (阿部 豊, Abe Yutaka; February 2, 1895 in Yamoto, Miyagi – January 3, 1977 in Kyoto) was a Japanese film director and actor.

== Early life ==
He went to America along with a younger brother to visit an uncle living in Los Angeles. There he enrolled in an acting school, and upon hearing that Thomas H. Ince was looking for Japanese extras to work in his studios, he applied and was accepted in 1914.

== Career ==
=== Acting ===
He appeared in such films as The Wrath of the Gods and The Cheat with Sessue Hayakawa. He was often billed as "Jack Abbe" or "Jack Yutake Abbe."

=== Directing ===
He returned to Japan in 1925, finding work at the Nikkatsu studio, and soon made his debut as a director. Among his early works was the 1926 silent film The Woman Who Touched the Legs (Ashi ni sawatta onna), a comedy about a writer and a woman thief. This film, along with most of Abe's early work, is now lost. Before and during World War II, Abe directed a number of nationalistic propaganda films including Moyuru ōzora (Flaming Sky) and Ano hata o ute (Fire on That Flag).

After the war, he directed the 1950 film adaptation of Jun'ichirō Tanizaki's The Makioka Sisters, a film which brought him commercial success. His later films include the 1959 satirical comedy Season of Affairs (Uwaki no kisetsu).

== Filmography ==
=== Actor ===
- The Wrath of the Gods (1914)
- The Cheat (1915)
- Her American Husband (1918)
- The Tong Man (1919)
- The Pagan God (1919)
- A Tale of Two Worlds (1921)

=== Director ===
- A Mermaid On Land (Riku no ningyo) (1926)
- The Woman Who Touched the Legs (1926)
- Five Women Around Him (Kare o meguru gonin no onna) (1927)
- Children of the Sun (Taiyō no ko) (1938)
- Moyuru ōzora (燃ゆる大空) (1940)
- Ano hata o ute (あの旗を撃て−コレヒドールの最後) (1944)
- The Makioka Sisters (1950)
- Koibito no iru machi (1953)
- Battleship Yamato (Senkan Yamato) (1953)
- Hanran: Ni-ni-roku jiken (1954)
- Nihon yaburezu (Japan Undefeated) (1954)
- Season of Affairs (Uwaki no kisetsu) (1959)
