= Woman and the Hunter =

1957 film

Woman and the Hunter, later re-released in the UK as Triangle on Safari, is a 1957 film by director George Breakston starring American actress Ann Sheridan.

It was shot in Africa. It was the last feature film of Sheridan who later said she wished the film "had been lost somewhere in Kenya".

== Cast ==
- Ann Sheridan
- David Farrar
- Jan Merlin
- John Loder
