= Matsumoto =

Matsumoto (松本 or 松元, "base of the pine tree") may refer to:

== Places ==
- Matsumoto, Nagano (松本市), a city
  - Matsumoto Airport, an airport southwest of Matsumoto, Nagano
- Matsumoto, Kagoshima (松元町), a former town now part of the city of Kagoshima
- Matsumoto Domain, a feudal domain in Shinano Province, modern-day Nagano Prefecture
- Matsumoto Pond, a pond in Victoria Land, Antarctica

== Other uses ==
- Matsumoto (surname), a surname and list of people with the name
- Matsumoto Castle, a castle in Matsumoto, Nagano
- Matsumoto Baseball Stadium, a baseball stadium in Matsumoto, Nagano
- Matsumoto Bus Terminal, a bus terminal in Matsumoto, Nagano
- Matsumoto Station, a railway station in Matsumoto, Nagano
- Matsumoto University, a university in Matsumoto, Nagano
- The Peninsula Hong Kong or Matsumoto Hotel

== See also ==
- Matsumoto sarin attack, Sarin gas release in Matsumoto, Nagano
- Matsumoto zeta function, a type of zeta function introduced by Kohji Matsumoto in 1990
