= Katsuhiko Haida =

American actor (1911-1982)

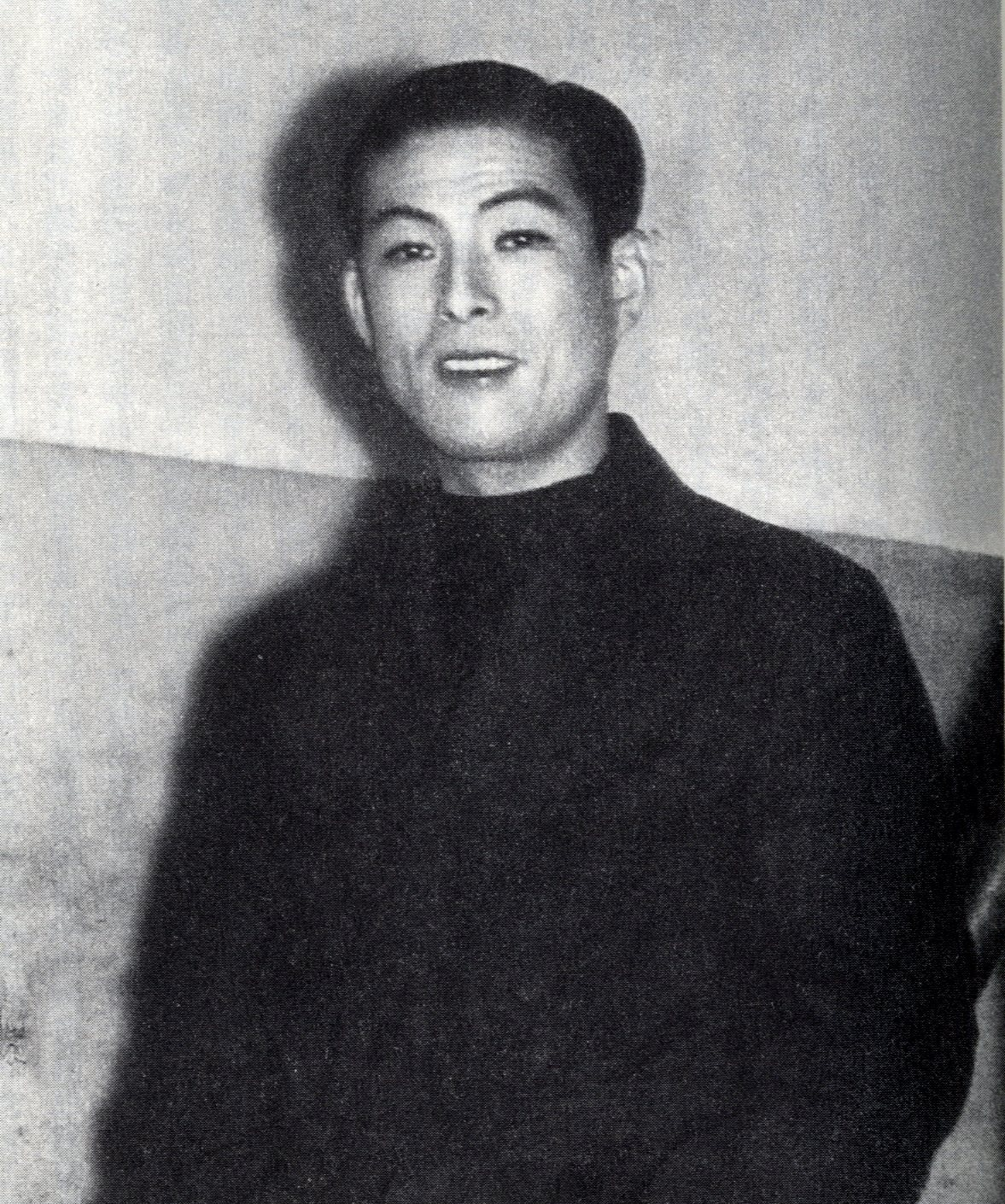
- Haida in 1930s
- Born: 20 August 1911; Honolulu
- Died: 26 October 1982 (aged 71)
- Citizenship: United States of America
- Occupation(s): Actor, singer, film producer
- Relatives: Yukihiko Haida (brother)

Katsuhiko Haida (1911–1982) was a Japanese film actor and music composer. He played an important role in the 1951 film Tokyo File 212. He also appeared in The Burning Sky, and Escapade From Japan. His brother is Yukihiko Haida, and they formed the Nihon Ukulele Association together.
