= George Breakston =

French-American actor film director (1920–1973)

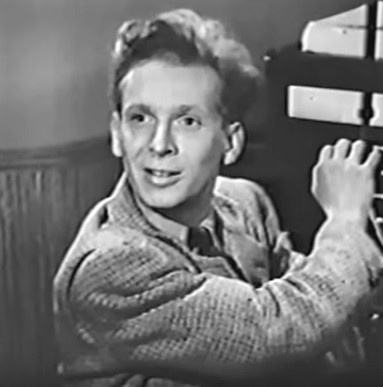
- Breakston in I Killed That Man (1941)
- Born: George Paul Breakston; January 22, 1920; Paris, France
- Died: May 21, 1973 (aged 53); Paris, France
- Occupations: Film director; actor; producer
- Years active: 1935–1966

George Paul Breakston (January 22, 1920 – May 21, 1973) was a French-American actor, producer and film director, active in Hollywood from his days as a child actor in Andy Hardy films in the 1930s (where he played the character Beezy), to a period as an independent producer/director in the 1950s.

== Biography ==
Breakston was the son of French-born Jacqueline DuVal. He first entered the entertainment world by working in radio as a child actor from 1930. Hs came to the notice of Hollywood and appeared in a variety of films. He made his stage debut in A Midsummer Night's Dream and made his motion picture debut in It Happened One Night (1934), where he plays a boy whose mother faints in a bus due to starvation.

Beginning in 1938, Breakston had a regular supporting role in MGM's popular Andy Hardy film series as Beezy, one of the friends of Andy portrayed by Mickey Rooney.

During World War II he was commissioned in the US Army Signal Corps through Officers Candidate School then served in the Pacific War as a photographer. When the war ended Breakston remained in Japan.

He reentered the civilian film world by co-writing, producing, directing and starring in Urubu: The Vulture People filmed in location in the Mato Grosso, Brazil. He followed it up with the documentary African Stampede filmed in the Belgian Congo and Kenya where he would later make his home.

Returning to Japan, Breakston co-produced and wrote Tokyo File 212 a 1951 American film credited as Hollywood's first feature film totally filmed in Japan. He followed it up by filming and directing Oriental Evil (1951) and Geisha Girl (1952) in Japan. He had planned a film, which according to Los Angeles Times had interested Errol Flynn.

Breakston moved to Kenya filming several safari adventure feature films The Scarlet Spear, Golden Ivory, Escape in the Sun, and Woman and the Hunter. Many of these featured John Bentley who starred in a television series produced by Breakston and filmed in Kenya, African Patrol. Breakston also filmed another series in Kenya Adventures of a Jungle Boy (1957) and planned a third Trader Horn.

Breakston joined the horror bandwagon by making The Manster in 1959 back in Japan, then made several films in Yugoslavia.

He died in Paris on May 21, 1973.

== Selected filmography ==
- It Happened One Night (1934, actor) - Boy Bus Passenger (uncredited)
- No Greater Glory (1934, actor) - Nemecsek
- A Successful Failure (1934, actor) - Tommy Cushing
- Mrs. Wiggs of the Cabbage Patch (1934, actor) - Jimmy Wiggs
- Great Expectations (1934, actor) - Pip, as Child
- Life Returns (1935, actor) - Danny Kendrick
- The Dark Angel (1935, actor) - Joe Gallop
- The Return of Peter Grimm (1935, actor) - William Van Dam
- Boulder Dam (1936, actor) - Stan Vangarick
- Small Town Girl (1936, actor) - Little Jimmy (uncredited)
- Second Wife (1936, actor) - Jerry Stephenson
- Love Finds Andy Hardy (1938, actor) - 'Beezy'
- Jesse James (1939, actor) - Farmer Boy
- Boy Slaves (1939, actor) - Harvey (uncredited)
- Andy Hardy Gets Spring Fever (1939, actor) - 'Beezy'
- Judge Hardy and Son (1939, actor) - 'Beezy' Anderson
- Swanee River (1939, actor) - Ambrose
- The Grapes of Wrath (1940, actor) - Boy (uncredited)
- Andy Hardy Meets Debutante (1940, actor) - 'Beezy'
- Andy Hardy's Private Secretary (1941, actor) - Beezy
- Life Begins for Andy Hardy (1941, actor) - Beezy, the Milkman (uncredited)
- I Killed That Man (1941, actor) - Tommy
- The Courtship of Andy Hardy (1942, actor) - 'Beezy'
- Men of San Quentin (1942, actor) - Louie Howard
- Urubu: The Vulture People (1948, actor, producer and director) - George
- Jungle Stampede (1950, actor, producer and director) - George Breakston (final film role)
- Tokyo File 212 (1951, producer)
- Oriental Evil (1951, producer and director)
- Geisha Girl (1952, producer and director)
- Golden Ivory (aka "The White Huntress"; 1954, producer and director)
- The Scarlet Spear (1954, director)
- Escape in the Sun (1956, producer and director)
- Woman and the Hunter (1957, producer and director)
- The Manster (1961, producer and director)
- Shadow of Treason (1964, producer and director)
- The Boy Cried Murder (1966, director)
