= Yū Terashima =

Japanese manga artist

Yū Terashima (寺島優, Terashima Yū; born 1949 in Tokyo, Japan) is a Japanese manga artist. After working in the Toho marketing department for a while, he made his manga debut by winning the 1st Shōnen Jump Original Manga Work Contest in 1978.

== Works ==
- Amaban! Kochira "Amagasa Bangumi Seisakubu"
- Kyōtei Shōjo, 14 volumes, 1996–2003
- Sangokushi Meigentan
- Tennis Boy, 14 volumes, 1980–1982
- Tokonatsu Shokudō Nankurunaisa, 3 volumes, 2005-current
- Winning Shot, 1 volume
- Wolf ni Kiss, 2 volumes, 1986
- Yūsha no Karute
