= The Scarlet Spear =

1954 film

- Directed by: George P. Breakston; C. Ray Stahl
- Written by: George P. Breakston; C. Ray Stahl
- Produced by: Irene Breakston; Charles Reynolds
- Starring: John Bentley; Martha Hyer
- Cinematography: Bernard Davies
- Edited by: John Shirley
- Music by: Ivor Slaney
- Production company: Charles Reynolds Productions
- Distributed by: United Artists
- Release date: 1 March 1954
- Running time: 87 minutes
- Country: United Kingdom
- Language: English

The Scarlet Spear is a 1954 British drama film directed by George P. Breakston and C. Ray Stahl and starring John Bentley and Martha Hyer. It was written by Breakston and Stahl. The cast consisted mostly of Kenyan actors. The plot concerns a British District Officer who tries to prevent a ritual killing.

== Plot ==
In the colonial era, Morasi is the son of Suliman, chief of the Maru peoples. When his father dies, Morasi must prove himself a worthy successor, which he chooses to do by honouring the tradition of "the scarlet spear" – dipping his weapon in the blood of a rival chief. Fearing that Morasi's murderous actions may spark a tribal war, British District Officer Jim Barneson tries to prevent him.

== Cast ==
- John Bentley as District Officer Jim T. Barneson
- Martha Hyer as Christine
- Morasi as Morasi, the chief's son
- Yusef as Yusef, the head bearer
- Faraji as Faraji, the second bearer
- Thea Gregory

== Reception ==
The Monthly Film Bulletin wrote: "Sturdy boys' adventure stuff, with a good deal of interesting animal photography."

Picturegoer wrote: "John Bentley is just right as'the hero, and his pukka portrayal makes the hectic tale, appropriately embellished with finely photographed close-ups of lions, hippos, rhinos and snakes, plausible and exciting. Moreover, heroine Martha Hyer has the grace of a gazelle. Personally, I thoroughly enjoyed this poor man's Where No Vultures Fly and warmly recommend it to all action fans and youngsters."

Variety wrote: "Africa's flora, fauna and tribal customs again come in for photographic scrutiny via "The Scarlet Spear." Any of these categories have the basic requisites of an entertaining film. But, unfortunately, this Charles Reynolds production is so slim on story and direction that it emerges as a tedious chronicle suitable only as supporting fare for the duals.... Of the trio of players it's safe to say that the laconic Bentley is the most impressive. Miss Hyer seems out of place in amidst the snakes and safaris while Morasi (who portrays himself) is rather colorless although he acquits himself favorably in hand-to-hand combat with snakes and other jungle denizens. Editing of John Shirley is remiss in that repetitious footage could have been trimmed considerably. Ivor Slaney's score is adequate as are other technical credits."

Picture Show called the film a "suspenseful adventure story", adding "The girl reporter ... is well-enacted by Martha Hyer. Of special interest are the beautifully photographed encounters with wild animals."

In British Sound Films: The Studio Years 1928–1959 David Quinlan rated the film as "average", writing: "Serviceable jungle thrills."
