= Ano hata o ute =

Dawn of Freedom
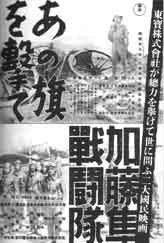
- Japanese theatrical release poster for Ano hata o ute
- Japanese: あの旗を撃て コレヒドールの最後
- Directed by: Yutaka Abe; Gerardo de León
- Written by: Yagi Koichiro, Oguni Hideo
- Starring: Denjirō Ōkōchi, Seizaburo Kawazu, Ichiro Tsukida, Heihachiro Okawa, Fernando Poe, Leopoldo Salcedo
- Cinematography: Yoshio Miyajima
- Music by: Toshiharu Ichikawa (billed as “Kunio Kasuga”) and Fumio Hayasaka (overseas version)
- Production company: Toho
- Release date: February 10, 1944
- Running time: 108 minutes
- Countries: Japan; Philippines
- Languages: Japanese; Filipino; Tagalog; English

Ano hata o ute korehidōru no saigo (Japanese Language: あの旗を撃て コレヒドールの最後) (Filipino: Liwayway ng Kalayaan) also known as Dawn of Freedom, and Shoot That Flag: The End of Corregidor is a 1944 Japanese-Filipino drama war film directed by Yutaka Abe and Gerardo de León.

== Synopsis ==
The opening credits start as the narrator speaks about Japan accepting the challenge of the Western powers' arms build-up after having had to stand by for years watching rapacious America and Britain tread upon the enslaved peoples of East Asia. Japan expeditionary forces are rushed to various places in the vast areas of Greater East Asia in order to drive out the Western powers. The first blow in the Philippines is death when Nippon warplanes raid Clark Air Base and Iba airfield on December 8, 1941.

The story of the Japanese victory at the Battle of Corregidor and the U.S. military's hasty retreat from the islands. The film presented the Japanese as Asian liberators who came to free the Filipinos from decades of colonial oppression. Sub-Corporal Ikejima (Heihachiro Okawa) helps a young boy named Toni (Ricardo Pasion), the younger brother of Capt. Garcia (Fernando Poe Sr.), to walk again after a car accident.

== About the film ==
The film premiered in Tokyo on February 5, 1944. Originally entitled Hitō sakusen (比島作戰) or Philippine Operation, it was changed to Ano hate o ute (literally "Shoot That Flag"). For the Philippines it was decided to use Liwayway ng Kalayaan ("Dawn of Freedom").

The use of Filipino and American prisoners of war as extras in the film became a matter of controversy after the end of the war.

== Cast and staff ==
Staff

- Sponsor: Ministry of Army
- Production: Kazuo Takimura
- Director: Yutaka Abe, Gerardo de Leon
- Shooting: Yoshiaki Miyajima, Hiroshi Takeuchi
- Screenplay: Yagi Ryuichiro, Oguni Hideo
- Special Technical Director: Eiji Tsuburaya, Eizo Mitani
- Music: Kunio Kasuga
- Art Director: Kitao Hideo, Kitazuo
- Editor: Toshio Goto

Cast

Japanese soldiers

- Denjirō Ōkōchi – Captain Hayami
- Seizaburo Kawazu
- Ichiro Tsukida – Lt. Nanoka
- Kaizaburo Kawazu – Captain Washio
- Fujita Shindo – Susumu
- Nakamura Satoshi – Nakamura Iku
- Masuki Jun – Senior officer Yamada
- Satoshi Komori – Senior officer Muramatsu
- Heihachiro Okawa – Sub Corporal Ikema Ikejima
- Tanaka Haruo – Lt. Sakuragi (military doctor)

Filipino soldiers and civilians

- Fernando Poe Sr. – Captain Gomez
- Leopoldo Salcedo – Captain Reyes
- Ángel Esmeralda – Lt. Garcia
- Norma Blancaflor
- Rosa Aguirre
- Ricardo Pasion – Toni (Tony)
- Gloria Romero

US Army and officers

- Bert Leroy
- Johnny Arville – Captain Adams
- Frankie Gordon
- Franco Garcia – Captain Smith
- E.S. (Ted) Lockard – US Army men (opening scene)
- Weldon Hamilton – Bataan surrender scene
- Burton C. Galde – Bataan surrender scene

== Availability ==
Dawn of Freedom was released in DVD on January 20, 2015, by Deagostini.
