= Film & History =

Peer-reviewed academic journal for the interdisciplinary study of moving-image arts

- Discipline: Media studies
- Language: English
- Edited by: Loren P. Q. Baybrook

Publication details
- History: 1970–present
- Publisher: Center for the Study of Film & History (United States)
- Frequency: Biannually

Standard abbreviations
- ISO 4: Film Hist.

Indexing
- ISSN: 0360-3695 (print); 1548-9922 (web)

Links
- Journal homepage

Film & History: An Interdisciplinary Journal is a peer-reviewed academic journal founded in 1970 and dedicated to the interdisciplinary study of film, television, and other moving-image arts. It is currently hosted by Lawrence University (Appleton, WI). The editor-in-chief is Loren P. Q. Baybrook. The journal is affiliated with the American Historical Association.

Additionally, the journal hosts an international scholarly conference in the autumn of each year.

== See also ==
- List of film periodicals
