= Tōru Nimura =

Japanese baseball player (born 1961)

Tōru Nimura 仁村 徹
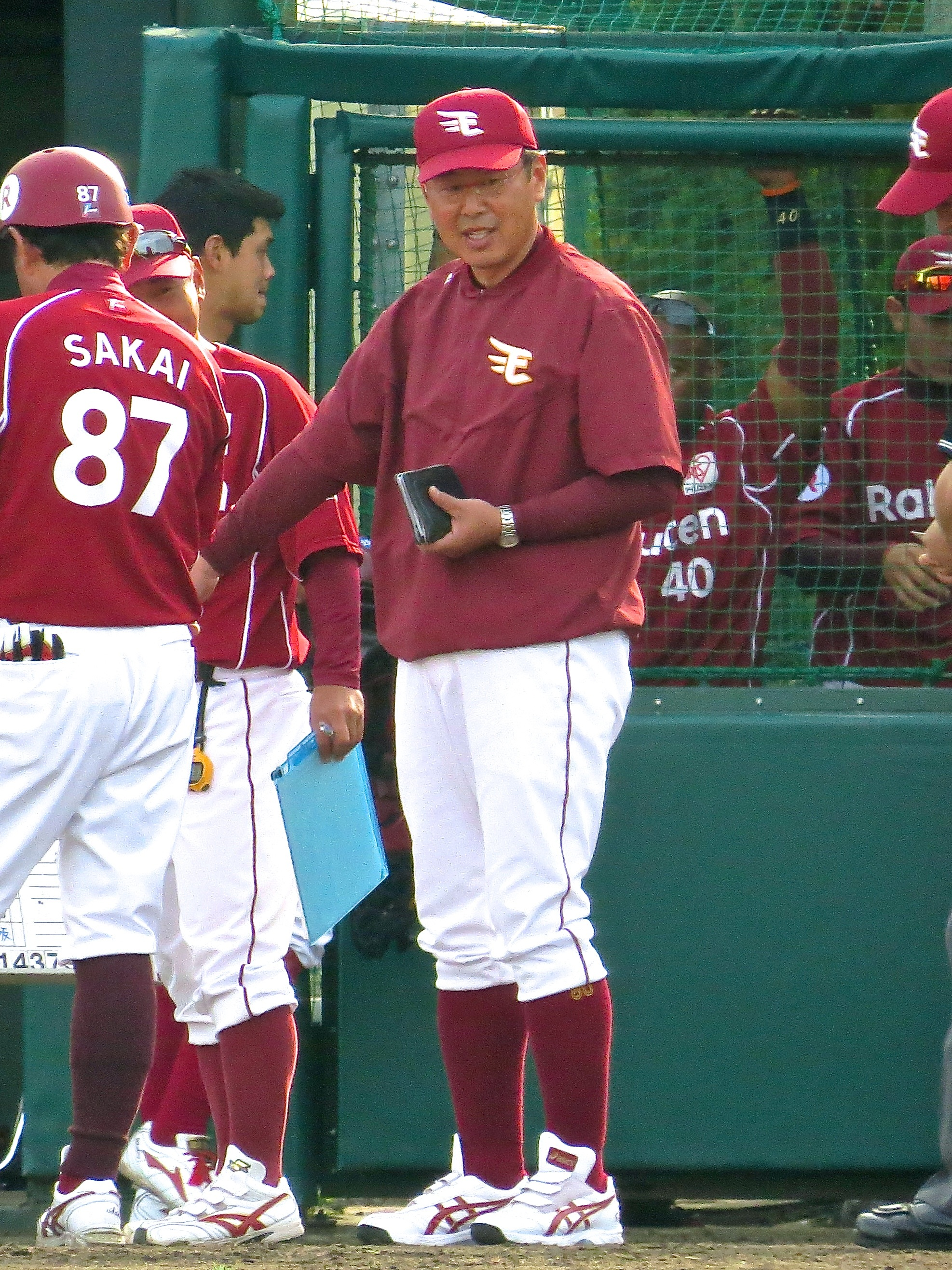
- Nimura in 2015 with the Rakuten Eagles
- Infielder/Manager
- Born: December 26, 1961 (age 64); Kawagoe, Saitama, Japan
- Batted: Right Threw: Right

NPB debut
- October 5, 1984, for the Chunichi Dragons

Last NPB appearance
- 1997, for the Chiba Lotte Marines

NPB statistics (through 1997)
- Games Played: 1068
- Batting average: .273
- Home runs: 67
- RBI: 344
- Stats at Baseball Reference

Teams
- As player: Chunichi Dragons (1984–1995); Chiba Lotte Marines (1995–1997); As Coach: Chunichi Dragons (1998–2004); Tohoku Rakuten Golden Eagles (2010–2016); Chunichi Dragons (2020–2021)

Career highlights and awards
- Japan Series champion (2013)

Tōru Nimura (仁村 徹, Nimura Tōru; born December 26, 1961 in Kawagoe, Saitama, Japan) is a Japanese former professional baseball infielder and pitcher. He played for the Chunichi Dragons and Chiba Lotte Marines.

He has been a coach since 1998 being on the payroll of his former club the Chunichi Dragons and the Tohoku Rakuten Golden Eagles.

On 25 September 2019, Nimura was invited to fill the role of farm team manager with his former team, the Chunichi Dragons. On 28 September, Nimura was officially unveiled as the second team manager for the 2020 Western League season.
