= Dekao Yokoo =

Japanese actor

- 横尾泥海男
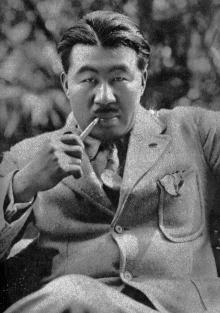
- Dekao Yokoo in the 1920s
- Born: 9 August 1899; Saga Prefecture
- Died: 5 July 1956 (aged 56)
- Occupation: Film actor

Dekao Yokoo (Japanese: 横尾 泥海男, Hepburn: Yokoo Dekao; 9 August 1899 – 5 July 1956) was a Japanese film actor active from the 1920s to the 1950s. He featured in over 90 films.

== Career ==
Born in Saga Prefecture, Yokoo studied Western painting at the Tokyo Bijitsu Gakkō (now the Tokyo University of the Arts). He joined the art department of the Shochiku studio in 1923, eventually becoming an assistant director, but due his large size, started playing comedic roles in films. He appeared in most of the films of Denmei Suzuki as well as in many comedy shorts directed by Torajiro Saito. After leaving Shochiku, he joined the comedy revue of Roppa Furukawa. After WWII, he appeared in many films starring Kin'ichi Shimizu.

He played a supporting role in Geisha Girl (1952).
