= Oriental Evil =

1951 film

- Directed by: George P. Breakston; C. Ray Stahl
- Screenplay by: C. Ray Stahl
- Produced by: George P. Breakston; C. Ray Stahl
- Starring: Byron Michie; Martha Hyer; Tetsu Nakamura
- Cinematography: Ichirô Hoshijima
- Edited by: Martin G. Cohn
- Music by: Albert Glasser
- Production company: Breakston-Stahl Productions
- Distributed by: Classic Pictures
- Release dates: June 29, 1951 (Japan); September 5, 1952 (US)
- Running time: 64 minutes
- Country: United States
- Language: English

Oriental Evil is a 1951 American drama film directed and produced by George Breakston and starring Martha Hyer and Tetsu Nakamura.

== Plot ==
Sheryl Banning, an American woman, has come to Tokyo to seek information on why her brother killed himself. She hopes to find his former business partner, Thomas Putnam, to gain some kind of understanding or explanation.

In the meantime, Roger Mansfield, a British businessman, marries a Japanese girl who is pregnant with his child. Roger one day encounters Sheryl and, after listening to her, volunteers to use his contacts in the city to help her locate Putnam if he can. Roger expresses his desire for Sheryl, who is unaware that he has a wife.

A blackmailer turns up wanting money from Roger, threatening to reveal that he and Putnam are one and the same. Sheryl overhears him being called "Tom" and suspects the truth. Roger goes on a rampage, beating his wife, causing her to lose the baby and driving her to suicide. Roger burns down the house and flees, but, when caught, falls on his own knife.

== Cast ==
- Martha Hyer as Sheryl
- Byron Michie as Roger
- Tetsu Nakamura as Noritomu Moriaji
