= Herman Schopp =

American cinematographer (1899–1954)

- Born: 28 June 1899; Radzichower, Austria (now Radziejów, Poland)
- Died: 8 August 1954 (aged 55); Santa Marinella, Italy
- Occupation: cinematographer
- Known for: work with Frank Buck

Herman Schopp (28 June 1899 – 8 August 1954) was a cinematographer of the Frank Buck serial Jungle Menace.

== Early years ==
Schopp was born in Radzichower, Austria (now Radziejów, Poland). He immigrated to the US (New York City) 29 August 1907.

== Career ==
Schopp was cinematographer of The Mysterious Pilot, Son of Ingagi, The Secret of Treasure Island, and many other films. He was a World War II veteran.

== Work with Frank Buck ==
In 1937, Schopp was a cinematographer of the Frank Buck serial Jungle Menace.

== Death ==
Schopp died of heart failure while filming an Errol Flynn movie, Il Maestro di Don Giovanni, in Santa Marinella, Italy. A brother and a sister survived him. His ashes are interred in Beth Olam Cemetery in Los Angeles.
