= Rimi Natsukawa discography =

- Studio albums: 7
- Extended plays: 2
- Compilation albums: 7
- Tribute albums: 2
- Singles: 23
- Video albums: 3

This is the discography of Okinawan musician Rimi Natsukawa.

== Albums ==
=== Studio albums ===
Year	Album Information	Chart positions	Total sales
2002	Tida: Tida Kaji nu Umui (てぃだ～太陽・風ぬ想い～, Sun: Sun, Wind Thoughts): Released: September 21, 2002; Label: Victor Entertainment (VICL-60943); Formats: CD, digital download	24	279,376
2003	Sora no Keshiki (空の風景, A View of the Sky): Released: March 26, 2003; Label: Victor Entertainment (VICL-61094); Formats: CD, digital download	39	78,900
2004	Kaze no Michi (風の道, Wind Road): Released: September 22, 2004; Label: Victor Entertainment (VICL-61480); Formats: CD, digital download	36	30,113
2005	Ayakaji no Ne (彩風の音, The Sound of Colored Wind): Released: November 23, 2005; Label: Victor Entertainment (VICL-61733); Formats: CD, digital download	48	16,158
2007	Umui Kaji (想い風, Thought Wind): Released: March 9, 2007; Label: Victor Entertainment (VICL-62259); Formats: CD, digital download	76	6,416
2009	Kokoro no Uta (ココロノウタ, Songs of the Heart): Released: March 18, 2009; Label: Victor Entertainment (VIZL-327); Formats: 2CD+DVD, 2CD, digital download	77	3,516

=== Cover albums ===
Year	Album Information	Chart positions	Total sales
2002	Minamikaze (南風, South Wind) (EP): Released: March 21, 2002; Label: Victor Entertainment (VICL-60856); Formats: CD, digital download	37	370,953
2003	Famureuta (ファムレウタ ～子守唄～, Lullaby) (EP): Released: October 22, 2003; Label: Victor Entertainment (VICL-61207); Formats: CD, digital download	25	44,783
2007	Uta Sagashi: Request Cover Album (歌さがし ～リクエストカバーアルバム～, Song Search: Request Cover Album): Released: November 21, 2007; Label: Victor Entertainment (VICL-62660); Formats: CD, digital download	19	38,747
2010	Uta Sagashi: Asia no Kaze (歌さがし～アジアの風～, Song Search: Asian Wind): Released: February 24, 2010; Label: Victor Entertainment (VICL-63541~2); Formats: 2CD, digital download	TBA	TBA

=== Compilations albums ===
Year	Album Information	Chart positions	Total sales
2004	Okinawa no Kaze (沖縄の風, Okinawan Wind): Released: February 25, 2004; Label: Victor Entertainment (VICL-61301); Formats: CD, digital download	32	87,800
2005	Rimi Natsukawa Single Collection Vol. 1 (夏川りみ SINGLE COLLECTION Vol.1): Released: March 6, 2005; Label: Victor Entertainment (VICL-61605); Formats: CD, digital download	13	148,198
2006	Rimits: Best Duet Songs (RIMITs ～ベスト・デュエット・ソングス～, Besuto Duetto Songusu): Released: March 22, 2006; Label: Victor Entertainment (VICL-61915); Formats: CD, digital download	80	7,104
2006	Rimi Natsukawa Selection: Released: September 22, 2006; Label: Victor Entertainment (GUT21394); Formats: CD, CD+DVD	NA	NA
2008	Ai no Uta: Self-Selection Best (あいのうた ～セルフセレクション・ベスト～, Love Songs): Released: March 9, 2008; Label: Victor Entertainment (VICL-62766); Formats: CD, digital download	40	11,488
2009	Okinawa Uta: Chikyū no Kaze o Kanjite (おきなわうた ～琉球の風を感じて～, Okinawan Songs: Feel the Wind of the Earth): Released: November 25, 2009; Label: Victor Entertainment (VICL-63473); Formats: CD, digital download	158	2,249
2010	Misato Hoshi Best Collection (星美里 ベスト・コレクション) (as Misato Hoshi (星美里)): Released: March 3, 2010; Label: Pony Canyon (PCCS-86); Formats: CD	TBA	TBA

== Singles ==
Release	Title	Notes	Oricon Singles Charts	Sales Total	Album
1989	Shiori (しほり)	as Misato Hoshi (星美里).	—	—	Misato Hoshi Best Collection
1990	Yume Iro Memai (夢色めまい, Dream Color Dizziness)	as Misato Hoshi (星美里).	—	—	Misato Hoshi Best Collection
1990	Minato Ujō (港雨情, Harbour Rain Feelings)	as Misato Hoshi (星美里).			Misato Hoshi Best Collection
1999	Yūbae ni Yurete (夕映えにゆれて, Swaying in the Sunset)	Victor Entertainment debut single.	—	—	—
2000	Hana ni Naru (花になる, Become a Flower)		—	—	—
2001	Nada Sōsō (涙そうそう, Great Tears Are Spilling)		8	683,908	Minamikaze/Tida: Tida Kaji nu Umui
2003	Nada Sōsō (Special Live Version) (涙そうそう～スペシャル・ライブ・ヴァージョン～, Great Tears Are Spilling)	with Ryoko Moriyama, Begin.	32	32,848	Sora no Keshiki
2003	Michishirube (道しるべ, Signpost)		47	8,623	Sora no Keshiki
2003	Tori yo (鳥よ, Bird)		47	10,762	—
2003	Warabigami (Yamatoguchi) (童神～ヤマトグチ～, Little God (Standard Japanese))		16	70,495	Famureuta
2004	Nada Sōsō (Special Edition) (涙そうそう)		54	9,411	—
2004	Kana yo Kana yo (愛よ愛よ, Love Love)		39	20,005	Kaze no Michi
2004	Kokoro Tsutae (ココロツタエ, Heart Report)		47	38,414	Ayakaji no Ne
2005	Sayōnara Arigatō (さようなら ありがとう, Good-Bye, Thank You)		44	7,169	Ayakaji no Ne
2005	Hagushichao (ハグしちゃお, Tightly Hug)		78	3,028	—
2006	Sayōnara Arigatō (Ama no Kaze)/Mirai (さようなら ありがとう～天の風～/未来, Good-Bye, Thank You (Sky Wind)/Future)		30	11,859	Umui Kaji
2007	Furusato (フルサト, Home Town)		53	5,261	Umui Kaji
2007	Jidai/Wasurete wa Ikenai Mono (時代/忘れてはいけないもの, Era/Unforgettable Things)	Digital download.			Uta Sagashi: Request Cover Album
2007	Hana Saku Tabiji/Kiseki no Hana (花咲く旅路/キセキノハナ, Flowering Journey/Miracle Flower)	Digital download.			Uta Sagashi: Request Cover Album
2007	Cosmos/Kokoro (秋桜/こころ, Cosmos/Heart)	Digital download.			Uta Sagashi: Request Cover Album
2008	Ano Hana no Yō ni (あの花のように, Like That Flower)		94	4,502	Ai no Uta: Self-Selection Best
2008	Inochi no Oto/Daijōbu Daijōbu (いのちの音/だいじょぶ、だいじょうぶ, Sound of Life/I'm Okay, I'm Okay)		116	1,139	Kokoro no Uta
2009	Inochi no Rhythm (いのちのリズ, Life Rhythm)	Digital download.			TBA

== Other appearances ==
Release	Artist	Title	Notes	Album
2004	Hiroshi Itsuki feat. Rimi Natsukawa	Deigo to Hanasu (デイゴとはまなす, Talking with a Tiger's Claw Flower)		Onna no Ehon
2005	Chikuzen Sato with Rimi Natsukawa	Boku no Mune de Oyasumi (僕の胸でおやすみ, Goodbye with My Heart)	Features on "Rimits: Best Duet Songs" (2006)	The Selection of Cornerstones 1995-2004
2005	Rimi Natsukawa	'Aa Kōshien' Kimi yo Hachigatsu ni Atsuku Nare (「あゝ甲子園」君よ八月に熱くなれ, You Make Me Hot in August (from Ah, Kōshien))		Ningen Manyōka: Yū Aku Kashishū
2005	Kaoru Kurosawa duet with Rimi Natsukawa	Manten no Hoshi no Yoru (満天の星の夜, Night with a Sky Full of Stars)	Features on "Rimits: Best Duet Songs" (2006)	Love Anthem
2006	Andrea Bocelli duet with Rimi Natsukawa	Somos Novios (Ai no Yume) (ソモス・ノビオス～愛の夢, It's Impossible (Dream of Love))	Features on "Umui Kaji" (2007)	Amore (Japanese Edition)
2008	Taiyo Yamazawa presents Rimi Natsukawa	Utabito (歌人, Singer)		Music Tree
2009	Chage with Rimi Natsukawa	Boku wa Dō Kana (僕はどうかな, What Should I Do)		Many Happy Returns
2009	Rimi Natsukawa	Tada Sore Dake (ただそれだけ, It's Only That)		Katsuhisa Hattori

== VHS/DVD ==
- Ryūkyu no Kaze (琉球の風, Ryukyuan Wind) - February 25, 2004
- Rimi Natsukawa Concert Tour 2004: Unrimited - March 24, 2005
- Video Clip Collection - March 9, 2007
