= Rimi Natsukawa Selection =

Compilation album by Rimi Natsukawa
- Released: September 22, 2006
- Recorded: 2001–2006
- Genre: J-pop, traditional
- Length: 1:06:55
- Label: Victor Entertainment

Rimi Natsukawa chronology
Rimits: Best Duet Songs (2006)	Rimi Natsukawa Selection (2006)	Umui Kaji (2007)

Alternative covers
- Korean Cover

Rimi Natsukawa Selection is the fourth compilation album released by Rimi Natsukawa on September 22, 2006. It was only released outside Japan, in Taiwan, Singapore, South Korea, Malaysia and Hong Kong. It reached #1 on the Taiwanese album charts, charting for more than 60 weeks and selling over 42,000 copies.

== Content ==
Tracks #1-#9 are recordings from 2001 to 2003, and are taken from Minamikaze, Tida: Tida Kaji nu Umui and Sora no Keshiki. "Kana yo Kana yo" is from 2004's Kaze no Michi, "Tokotowa no Uta" and "Kokoro Tsutae" are from 2005's Ayakaji no Ne. This is the first album appearance for Natsukawa's songs "Hagushichao" and "Sayōnara Arigatō (Ama no Kaze)," which were released as singles in December 2005 and August 2006, respectively. "Hagushichao" was placed on the album as a bonus track (the album is currently the only Natsukawa album featuring the song).

The Taiwanese version came with a DVD attached, featuring three music videos. One of them, "Tsuki nu Kaisha," was a song that did not feature in the CD.

Care was made to select Natsukawa tracks that had been covered by Chinese artists. Included are "Famureuta" (Jody Chiang's "Si Nian Yo (思念喲 I Miss You?)"), "Hana" (Wakin Chau's "Hua Xin (花心 Flower Heart)"), "Nada Sōsō" (Huang Pin-Yuan's "Bai Lu Si (白鷺鷥 White Heron)"/Joi Chua's "Pei Wo Kan Ri Chu (陪我看日出 Watching the Sunrise with Me)"), "Shima Uta" (Fish Leong's "Bu Xiang Sui (不想睡 Not Sleepy)") and "Warabigami" (Cyndi Wang's "Fei Ba (飛吧 Flying Blind)").

== Promotion ==
A month after the album's release, Natsukawa performed a Taiwanese concert to 3,000 people. A year later in December 2007, she performed two more due to the substantial sales of the album.

== Track listings ==
=== CD ===
No.	Title	Writer(s)	Arranger(s)	Length
1.	"Nada Sōsō (涙そうそう, Great Tears Are Spilling)"	Begin, Ryoko Moriyama	Seiichi Kyōda	4:18
2.	"Asadoya Yunta (安里屋ユンタ, The Ballad of Asadoya)"	Katsu Hoshi, Traditional	Kyōda	4:05
3.	"Warabigami (Yamatoguchi) (童神～ヤマトグチ～, Little God (Standard Japanese))"	Misako Koja, Kazuya Sahara	Kyōda	4:45
4.	"Shima Uta (島唄, Island Song)"	Kazufumi Miyazawa	Kyōda	5:17
5.	"Akata Sundunchi (赤田首里殿内, Akata District, Shuri)"	Traditional	Kyōda	5:49
6.	"Famureuta (ファムレウタ（子守唄）, Lullaby)"	Yukito Ara, Masaaki Uechi	Kyōda	4:19
7.	"Hana (花, Flowers)"	Shoukichi Kina	Chuei Yoshikawa	6:23
8.	"Sa La La (サ・ラ・ラ)"	Rimi, Natsumi Hirai	Kyōda	5:08
9.	"Shimajima Kaisha (島々清しゃ, Purity of the Islands)"	Hitoshi Kume, Tsuneo Fukuhara	Kyōda	5:01
10.	"Tokotowa no Uta (とことわのうた, Everlasting Song)"	Kundō Koyama, Chikuzen Sato	Kyōda	4:17
11.	"Kana yo Kana yo (愛よ 愛よ, Love Love)"	Kazufumi Miyazawa	Miyazawa	4:37
12.	"Kokoro Tsutae (ココロツタエ, Heart Report)"	Shinji Tanimura	Akira Senju	4:23
13.	"Sayōnara Arigatō (Ama no Kaze) (さようなら ありがとう～天の風～, Good-Bye, Thank You (Sky Wind))"	Kentarō Kobuchi	Kobuchi	4:44
14.	"Hagushichao (ハグしちゃお, Tightly Hug)"	Yoko Aki, Ryudo Usagi	Kyōda	3:49

=== DVD ===
No.	Title	Length
1.	"Nada Sōsō (Music Video)"	4:18
2.	"Tsuki nu Kaisha (月ぬ美しゃ, Beauty of the Moon) (Music Video)"	4:03
3.	"Sayōnara Arigatō (Ama no Kaze) (Music Video)"	4:44
