= Okinawa Uta: Chikyū no Kaze o Kanjite =

Compilation album by Rimi Natsukawa
- Released: November 25, 2009
- Recorded: 2001–2007
- Genre: Traditional
- Length: 47:18
- Label: Victor Entertainment

Rimi Natsukawa chronology
Kokoro no Uta (2009)	Okinawa Uta: Chikyū no Kaze o Kanjite (2009)	Uta Sagashi: Asia no Kaze (2010)

Okinawa Uta: Chikyū no Kaze o Kanjite (おきなわうた ～琉球の風を感じて～, Okinawan Songs: Feel the Wind of the Earth) is Rimi Natsukawa's 6th compilation album released on November 25, 2009, and her second compilation album to centre on an Okinawan song theme.

== Song sources ==
Almost all the songs originate from Natsukawa's first three album releases (2002–2003): Minamikaze, Tida: Tida Kaji nu Umui and Sora no Keshiki. There are three exceptions: "Basi nu Turi Bushi" is from her "Michishirube" single (2003), "Matsuri no Ato Kaze" is from Umui Kaji (2007) and "Densaa Bushi" is from Uta Sagashi: Request Cover Album (2007).

The two final tracks are bonus live recordings of songs from Minamikaze.

== Track listing ==
No.	Title	Writer(s)	Arranger(s)	Length
1.	"Nada Sōsō (涙そうそう, Great Tears Are Spilling)"	Begin, Ryoko Moriyama	Seiichi Kyōda	4:20
2.	"Warabigami (童神, Little God)"	Misako Koja, Kazuya Sahara	Kyōda	5:09
3.	"Bashōfu (芭蕉布, Banana Cloth)"	Yasuichi Yoshikawa, Tsuneo Fukuhara	Kyōda	4:37
4.	"Tinsagu nu Hana (てぃんさぐぬ花, Balsam Flowers)"	Traditional	Chuei Yoshikawa	4:33
5.	"Shima Uta (島唄, Island Song)"	Kazufumi Miyazawa	Kyōda	5:19
6.	"Densaa Bushi (デンサー節, Tradition Song)"	Traditional	Masaaki Uechi	3:56
7.	"Shimajima Kaisha (島々清しゃ, Purity of the Islands)"	Hitoshi Kume, Fukuhara	Kyōda	5:01
8.	"Akata Sandunchi (赤田首里殿内, Akata District, Shuri)"	Traditional	Kyōda	5:49
9.	"Tsuki nu Kaisha (月ぬ美しゃ, Beauty of the Moon)"	Traditional	Kyōda	4:03
10.	"Hana (花, Flowers)"	Shoukichi Kina	C. Yoshikawa	6:19
11.	"Basi nu Turi Bushi (Rimi Natsukawa Sanshin Hikigatari Version) (鷲ぬ鳥節～夏川りみ三線弾き語りヴァージョン～, Eagle Song (Rimi Natsukawa Sanshin Acoustic Version))"	Traditional	Natsukawa	3:43
12.	"Matsuri no Ato Kaze (祭りのあと風, Wind After the Festival)"	Isamu Shimoji, Hitoshi Uechi	H. Uechi	5:17
13.	"Irayoi Tsukiyohama (Live Rokuon) (イラヨイ月夜浜(ライブ録音), Treasured Moonlit Beach (Live Recording))"	Yasukatsu Ōjima, Eishō Higa	C. Yoshikawa	6:00
14.	"Ōgon no Hana (Live Rokuon) (黄金の花(ライブ録音), Green Gold Flower (Live Recording))"	Osami Okamoto, Sadao China	C. Yoshikawa	6:23

== Japan Sales Rankings ==
Release	Chart	Peak position	First week sales	Sales total
November 25, 2009	Oricon Weekly Albums Chart	158	816	2,249
