= Kokoro no Uta =

Studio album by Rimi Natsukawa
- Released: March 18, 2009
- Recorded: 2008–2009
- Genre: J-pop, Shima uta, traditional
- Length: 1:19:57
- Label: Victor Entertainment

Rimi Natsukawa chronology
Ai no Uta: Self-Selection Best (2008)	Kokoro no Uta (2009)	Okinawa Uta: Chikyū no Kaze o Kanjite (2009)

Singles from Kokoro no Uta
- 1. "Inochi no Oto/Daijōbu, Daijōbu" Released: July 23, 2008

Kokoro no Uta (ココロノウタ, Songs of the Heart) is Rimi Natsukawa's sixth original album, released on March 18, 2009. The album was a 2-CD set, with the first CD featuring studio recordings, and the second performances from her "Uta Sagashi no Tabi 2008-2009 (歌さがしの旅 2008-2009, Song Search Journey 2008-2009) tour. The limited edition also featured a DVD.

== Background ==
Umui Kaji was released after two singles. "Sayōnara Arigatō (Ama no Kaze)/Mirai" in August 2006 was a re-arrangement of her song "Sayōnara Arigatō" (a single from Ayakaji no Ne) by the song's writer, Kentarō Kobuchi of Kobukuro. The second A-side, "Mirai," did not feature on the album. "Furusato" was written by singer Noriyuki Makihara, and was used as the theme song for the drama Asakusa Fukumaru Ryokan.

== Contents ==
The studio disc features a greater variety of songwriters/arrangers than Natsukawa's previous works. "Unju no Furusato" was a collaboration between Chiharu Tamashiro of the band Kiroro and entertainer Gorie (who wrote the song's lyrics). It was used as the movie "Minami no Shima no Furimun"'s theme song (which starred Gorie). The bonus track, "Māmāhō," is a cover of the song sung by Josephine Siao in the 1960 Chinese film Ku Er Liu Lang Ji (苦兒流浪記). The original version features on "Famureuta."

The live disc was recorded at Natsukawa's Uta Sagashi no Tabi concert at the Chukyo University Culture Meeting Hall (中京大学文化市民会館) on December 23, 2008. Two exceptions are "Amazing Grace" and "Toki no Wakare ni Mi o Makase," which were recorded at the Machida town hall (町田市民ホール) on October the 24th, 2008.

The entire live disc is made up of cover songs. Tracks #1-#4 (as well as #9) are songs that did not make it onto the Uta Sagashi: Request Cover Album in 2007. Tracks #5-#8 are covers already released by Natsukawa (three tracks are from 2002's Minamikaze, and one from 2003's Sora no Keshiki)

The limited edition DVD features recordings from the December concert.

== Track listing ==
All songs on the "In Concert" disc performed by the 54 Band.

Disc 1: In Studio
No.	Title	Writer(s)	Arranger(s)	Length
1.	"Unju no Furusato (ウンジュの原点, Your Hometown)"	Gorie, Chiharu Tamashiro	Tomoki Ishizuka	5:48
2.	"Ai ni Iku yo (会いに行くよ, I'm Going to Meet You)"	Megumi Ayukawa, Jusqu'à Grand-Père	Masayuki Sakamoto	4:29
3.	"Tatta Hitori (たったひとり, The Only One)"	Wakako Kaku, Takatomo Nozawa	Face 2 Fake	5:18
4.	"Inochi no Oto (いのちの音, Sound of Life)"	Chokkyū Murano, Sachiko Kumagai	Akira Inoue	4:49
5.	"Hatenaki Omoi (果てなき想い, Endless Thoughts)"	Saiko Kawamura, Face 2 Fake	Face 2 Fake	4:38
6.	"Chichi nu Mapiroma (チチヌマピロマ, Okinawan: Daytime Moon)"	Shunpei Kishimoto, Masaaki Uechi	Teruyuki Chinen	3:06
7.	"Hikaranai Hoshi (光らない星, Unshining Star)"	Masumi Kawamura, Takuya Harada	Sakamoto	4:31
8.	"Māmāhō (Tida Chichi Kaji Ver.) (マーマーホー(てぃだ・ちち・かじver.), Mama's the Best (Sun Moon Wind Ver.))" (bonus track)	Li Jun Qing, Eiko Kyo, Liu Hong Yuan	Hiromi Daigo	3:35
Total length:				36:14

Disc 2: In Concert
No.	Title	Writer(s)	Length
1.	"Amazing Grace" (traditional)	John Newton	3:23
2.	"Mirai e (未来へ, To the Future)" (Kiroro)	Chiharu Tamashiro	5:12
3.	"Sekibetsu no Komoriuta (惜別の子守唄, Parting Lullaby)" (Tomoko)	Tomoko	3:36
4.	"Toki no Nagare ni Mi o Makase (時の流れに身をまかせ, Give Yourself to the Flow of Time)" (Teresa Teng)	Toyohisa Araki, Takashi Miki	4:03
5.	"Ōgon no Hana (黄金の花, Green Gold Flower)" (Nēnēs)	Osami Okamoto, Sadao China	6:24
6.	"Nada Sōsō (涙そうそう, Great Tears Are Spilling)" (Ryoko Moriyama/Begin)	Moriyama, Begin	4:43
7.	"Irayoi Tsukiyohama (イラヨイ月夜浜, Treasured Moonlit Beach)" (Yasukatsu Ōjima)	Ōjima, Eishō Higa	5:56
8.	"Manten no Hoshi (満天の星, Sky Full of Stars)" (Parsha Club)	Toshiaki Arashiro, Masaaki Uechi	4:58
9.	"Shimanchu nu Takara (島人ぬ宝, Island People Treasures)" (Begin)	Begin	5:28
Total length:			43:43

DVD: Chukyo University Culture Meeting Hall, 23rd of December 2008
No.	Title	Writer(s)	Length
1.	"Ai no Chikara (愛のチカラ, The Power of Love)"	Mamoru Miyagi, Johnny Ginowan
2.	"Amazing Grace" (traditional)	Newton
3.	"Warabigami (Yamatoguchi) (童神～ヤマトグチ～, Little God (Standard Japanese))" (Misako Koja)	Koja, Kazuya Sahara
4.	"Nada Sōsō (涙そうそう, Great Tears Are Spilling)" (Moriyama/Begin)	Moriyama, Begin
5.	"Irayoi Tsukiyohama (イラヨイ月夜浜, Treasured Moonlit Beach)" (Ōjima)	Ōjima, Higa
6.	"Manten no Hoshi (満天の星, Sky Full of Stars)" (Parsha Club)	Arashiro, Uechi
7.	"Shimanchu nu Takara (島人ぬ宝, Island People Treasures)" (Begin)	Begin
8.	"Asadoya Yunta (安里屋ユンタ, The Ballad of Asadoya)" (traditional)	Katsu Hoshi, traditional
9.	"Kachaashii Medley 'Hug Shichao' 'Haisai Ojisan' (カチャーシーメドレー「ハグしちゃお」「ハイサイおじさん」, Kachaashii Medley 'Tightly Hug' 'Hey Old Man')" (Natsukawa, Shoukichi Kina & Champloose)	Yoko Aki, Ryudo Usagi, Kina
10.	"Gokoku Hōjō (五穀豊穣, Good Cereal Crop)" (Parsha Club)	Yukito Ara, Uechi
11.	"Itoshii Hito e (いとしい人へ, To My Dear)"	Megumi Ayukawa, Akira Senju
12.	"Kyō no Hi wa Sayōnara (今日の日はさようなら, Today Is the Goodbye)" (Moriyama)	Shōichi Kaneko

== Japan sales rankings ==
Release	Chart	Peak position	First week sales	Sales total
March 18, 2009	Oricon Weekly Albums Chart	77	2,031	3,516
