= Okinawa no Kaze =

Compilation album by Rimi Natsukawa
- Released: February 25, 2004
- Recorded: 2001–2004
- Genre: Shima uta, traditional
- Length: 47:18
- Label: Victor Entertainment

Rimi Natsukawa chronology
Famureuta (2003)	Okinawa no Kaze (2004)	Kaze no Michi (2004)

Okinawa no Kaze (沖縄の風, Okinawan Wind) is a compilation album released by Rimi Natsukawa on February 25, 2004, marketed as an Okinawan song cover album.

== Song sources ==
The album features 10 covers of songs by Okinawan artists. Eight of these are already released tracks. Of the new songs, "Umi no Kanata" is a Parsha Club cover, and "Kui nu Hajimi" is a Misako Koja cover. Both of these artists have been covered before by Natsukawa, and those songs also feature on the album ("Famureuta"/"Manten no Hoshi," "Warabigami" respectively).

Four of the songs are originally from Minamikaze, and two from Tida: Tida Kaji nu Umui and Sora no Keshiki each.

== Track listing ==
No.	Title	Writer(s)	Arranger(s)	Length
1.	"Umi no Kanata (海の彼方, Other Side of the Sea)"	Maya Nekoda, Masaaki Uechi	Seiichi Kyōda	4:52
2.	"Warabigami (Yamatoguchi) (童神～ヤマトグチ～, Little God (Standard Japanese))"	Misako Koja, Kazuya Sahara	Kyōda	4:47
3.	"Kui nu Hajimi (恋ぬ初み, Okinawan: First Love)"	Koja, Sahara	Kyōda	4:24
4.	"Manten no Hoshi (満天の星, Sky Full of Stars)"	Toshiaki Arashiro, Uechi	Kyōda	4:28
5.	"Irayoi Tsukiyohama (イラヨイ月夜浜, Treasured Moonlit Beach)"	Yasukatsu Ōjima, Eishō Higa	Chuei Yoshikawa	5:41
6.	"Shimajima Kaisha (島々清しゃ, Purity of the Islands)"	Hitoshi Kume, Tsuneo Fukuhara	Kyōda	5:02
7.	"Famureuta (ファムレウタ（子守唄）, Lullaby)"	Yukito Ara, Uechi	Kyōda	4:19
8.	"Ōgon no Hana (黄金の花, Green Gold Flower)"	Osami Okamoto, Sadao China	Yoshikawa	4:48
9.	"Bashōfu (芭蕉布, Banana Cloth)"	Yasuichi Yoshikawa, Fukuhara	Kyōda	4:38
10.	"Nada Sōsō (涙そうそう, Great Tears Are Spilling)"	Begin, Ryoko Moriyama	Kyōda	4:19

== Japan sales rankings ==
Release	Chart	Peak position	First week sales	Sales total
February 25, 2004	Oricon Weekly Albums Chart	32	8,250	87,800
