= Tida: Tida Kaji nu Umui =

Album by Rimi Natsukawa

Studio album by Rimi Natsukawa
- Released: September 21, 2002
- Recorded: 2001–2002
- Genre: J-pop Shimauta, traditional
- Length: 52:15
- Label: Victor Entertainment

Rimi Natsukawa chronology
Minamikaze (2002)	Tida: Tida Kaji nu Umui (2002)	Sora no Keshiki (2003)

Singles from Tida: Tida Kaji nu Umui
- 1. "Nada Sōsō" Released: March 23, 2001

Tida: Tida Kaji nu Umui (てぃだ ～太陽・風ぬ想い～, Sun: Sun, Wind Thoughts) is Rimi Natsukawa's debut album, released on September 21, 2002. The title of the album is in Okinawan (Uchinaaguchi).

== Background ==
The album is Natsukawa's first full-length album release, after her EP Minamikaze released earlier in the year. Both releases feature her hit single, "Nada Sōsō." The album is formulated of four original songs and seven cover tracks. This continues with the structure of "Minamikaze," which consisted of six covers and an original track.

Three singles were released before the album, however "Yūbae ni Yurete" (夕映えにゆれて, Swaying in the Sunset) and "Hana ni Naru" (花になる, Become a Flower) do not feature. They were released onto Rimi Natsukawa Single Collection Vol. 1 in 2005.

== Song sources ==
The songs on the album relate to Okinawa in some way, either being written by Okinawan musicians, describe Okinawa or are written in the style of Okinawan songs. "Asadoya Yunta" and "Akata Sundunchi" are traditional folk songs, while "Famureuta," "Nada Sōsō" and "Tsuki no Yoru" were written by famous Okinawan bands (Parsha Club, Begin and Kiroro respectively). Shima Uta was written by Japanese band The Boom on their impressions of Okinawa when visiting it.

"Akahana Hitotsu," "Kokoro no Katachi," "Rakuen (Makaru Sari)" and "Tsuki no Kaori" are original compositions. "Akahana Hitotsu" was written by Begin guitarist Masaru Shimabukuro.

== Track listing ==
No.	Title	Writer(s)	Arranger(s)	Length
1.	"Asadoya Yunta (安里屋ユンタ, The Ballad of Asadoya)"	Katsu Hoshi, Traditional	Seiichi Kyōda	4:05
2.	"Akahana Hitotsu (赤花ひとつ, A Single Red Flower)"	Masaru Shimabukuro	Kyōda	5:25
3.	"Famureuta (ファムレウタ（子守唄）, Lullaby)"	Yukito Ara, Masaaki Uechi	Kyōda	4:19
4.	"Kokoro no Katachi (心のかたち, Shape of My Heart)"	Osami Okamoto, Chuei Yoshikawa	Yoshikawa	4:39
5.	"Shima Uta (島唄, Island Song)"	Kazufumi Miyazawa	Kyōda	5:17
6.	"Tsuki no Yoru (月の夜, Moon Night)"	Kiroro	Kyōda	3:35
7.	"Rakuen (Makaru Sari) (楽園～マカル・サリ～, Paradise)"	Shinri Hayama, Kyōda	Kyōda	4:48
8.	"Akata Sundunchi (赤田首里殿内, Akata District, Shuri)"	Traditional	Kyōda	5:49
9.	"Tsuki no Kaori (月のかほり, Smell of the Moon)"	Hayama, Yasunori Sōryō	Yoshikawa	5:21
10.	"Bashōfu (芭蕉布, Banana Cloth)"	Yasuichi Yoshikawa, Tsuneo Fukuhara	Kyōda	4:38
11.	"Nada Sōsō (涙そうそう, Great Tears Are Spilling)"	Begin, Ryoko Moriyama	Kyōda	4:19

== Japan sales rankings ==
Release	Chart	Peak position	First week sales	Sales total
September 21, 2002	Oricon Weekly Albums Chart	24	9,050	279,376
