= Uta Sagashi: Request Cover Album =

Studio album by Rimi Natsukawa
- Released: November 21, 2007
- Recorded: 2007
- Genre: J-pop, Shima uta, traditional
- Length: 1:08:23 (CD limited edition); 1:08:44 (download special edition); 1:04:01
- Label: Victor Entertainment

Rimi Natsukawa chronology
Umui Kaji (2007)	Uta Sagashi: Request Cover Album (2007)	Ai no Uta: Self-Selection Best (2008)

Singles from Uta Sagashi
- 1. "Jidai/Wasurete wa Ikenai Mono" Released: September 26, 2007; 2. "Hana Saku Tabiji/Kiseki no Hana" Released: October 29, 2007; 3. "Cosmos/Kokoro" Released: November 7, 2007

Uta Sagashi: Request Cover Album (歌さがし ～リクエストカバーアルバム～, Song Search: Request Cover Album) is Rimi Natsukawa's first full-length cover album, released on November 21, 2007.

Her cover of "'S Wonderful" was used as the JVC Everio camcorder commercial song.

== Background ==
"Uta Sagashi" was released 8 months after her 5th studio album, "Umui Kaji." It was her first cover album since 2003's "Famureuta." The project was decided on to extend Natsukawa's signature songs (based on the fact that her two most popular songs, "Nada Sōsō" and "Warabigami" are both covers).

Fans submitted song suggestions to Natsukawa's website or at her live concerts. A total of 2,000 were chosen by fans, and the top 100 were given to Natsukawa to select. Natsukawa listened to each of these songs once or twice, and chose the songs she found catchy and were practical to sing. Roughly half of the songs are ones that Natsukawa had performed in concert or on live television at some point.

Natsukawa's favourite song in the selection process was "Kiseki no Hana" written by Lyrico, a song she had requested herself. The song, after hearing Lyrico in concert, had the same effect "Nada Sōsō" had on her the first time she had heard it.

The album was preceded by three digital singles released on iTunes. Each single featured two tracks from the album. "Jidai/Wasurete wa Ikenai Mono" was released in late September, followed by "Hana Saku Tabiji/Kiseki no Hana" in late October. "Cosmos/Kokoro" was released in early November, two weeks before the album's release.

== Song sources ==
Unlike Natsukawa's previous covers, the majority of the songs chosen are either Japanese pop music standards, or popular music songs. "Cosmos," "Jidai" and "Nagoriyuki" are standards from the '70s (popularised by Momoe Yamaguchi, Miyuki Nakajima and Iruka respectively). "Miagete Goran Yoru no Hoshi o" is a song by Kyu Sakamoto from 1963, and "Shōnen Jidai" is a more recent standard, by Yōsui Inoue in 1990.

Two standards were released earlier than 1950, but were later released as film theme songs. "Soshū Yakyoku" was performed by Yoshiko Ōtaka in the film "Shina no Yoru" (1940), and later used as the theme song for the 1953 film "Hōyō." "'S Wonderful" is an English standard, first used in the 1927 musical "Funny Face." It was used in the 1950s films "An American in Paris" and "Funny Face."

Natsukawa covered two recent popular hit songs: "Chiisana Koi no Uta" by Mongol800 (2001) and "Sakura (Dokushō)" by Naotarō Moriyama. Naotarō is the son of Ryoko Moriyama, the singer who first released Natsukawa's hit song "Nada Sōsō" and wrote the lyrics to it.

Two songs are covers of recent songs that were not popular hits. "Kiseki no Hana" was originally sung by Lyrico in 2002, and "Wasurete wa Ikenai Mono" by Kobukuro in 2004. These songs were collaborations with people Natsukawa has worked with before: Takeshi Senoo had arranged the song "Shimadachi" from Natsukawa's 2005 album "Ayakaji no Ne," and Kentarō Kobuchi of Kobukuro had written Natsukawa's single "Sayōnara Arigatō" (along with "Wasurete wa Ikenai Mono").

Two songs are from the 1990s. "Hana Saku Tabiji" is a popular song by Southern All Stars keyboardist Yuko Hara (from her 1991 album "Mother") and "Kokoro" is a song by Tomoe Sawa.

One of the songs is an Okinawan folk song, "Densaa Bushi." It was originally written in 1768. The song was not requested from the fan tally, however, it was requested by Natsukawa's mother.

== Reception ==
The album broke the top 20 and sold roughly 40,000 copies. This makes the album Natsukawa's most commercially successful release of new recordings since 2003's "Famureuta," and her highest-charting album of new recordings (her second highest charting Japanese release after "Rimi Natsukawa Single Collection Vol. 1").

The project was originally only meant to last from 2007 to 2008, and feature the album and a tour. However, due to this popularity, a second cover album, "Uta Sagashi: Asia no Kaze," was released just over two years later in 2010.

== Track listing ==
No.	Title	Writer(s)	Arranger(s)	Length
1.	"Jidai (時代, Era)" (Miyuki Nakajima)	Nakajima	Masayoshi Furukawa	6:10
2.	"Hana Saku Tabiji (花咲く旅路, Flowering Journey)" (Yuko Hara)	Keisuke Kuwata	Akira Inoue	4:53
3.	"Cosmos (秋桜, Kosumosu)" (Momoe Yamaguchi)	Masashi Sada	Furukawa	4:41
4.	"Sakura (Dokushō) (さくら(独唱), Cherry Blossoms (Vocal Solo))" (Naotarō Moriyama)	Moriyama, Kaito Okachimachi	Furukawa	4:51
5.	"Wasurete wa Ikenai Mono (忘れてはいけないもの, Things That Mustn't Be Forgotten)" (Kobukuro)	Kentarō Kobuchi	A. Inoue	4:34
6.	"Kokoro (こころ, Heart)" (Tomoe Sawa)	Kim Tong-Myeong, Sawa	Furukawa	3:27
7.	"Nagori Yuki (なごり雪, Snow Traces)" (Kaguyahime/Iruka)	Shōzō Ise	A. Inoue	3:55
8.	"Kiseki no Hana (キセキノハナ, Miracle Flower)" (Lyrico)	Lyrico, Takeshi Senoo	Furukawa	5:05
9.	"Soshū Yakyoku (蘇州夜曲, Suzhou Nocturne)" (Yoshiko Ōtaka)	Yaso Saijō, Ryoichi Hattori	Furukawa	4:28
10.	"Shōnen Jidai (少年時代, Childhood Days)" (Yōsui Inoue)	Y. Inoue, Shinji Kawahara	A. Inoue	4:15
11.	"'S Wonderful" (musical Funny Face)	Ira Gershwin, George Gershwin	Masanori Sasaji	3:07
12.	"Miagete Goran Yoru no Hoshi o (見上げてごらん夜の星を, Look Up at the Stars in the Night)" (Kyu Sakamoto)	Rokusuke Ei, Taku Izumi	A. Inoue	5:11
13.	"Chiisana Koi no Uta (小さな恋のうた, Little Love Song)" (Mongol800)	Kiyosaku Uezu, Mongol800	Furukawa	5:06
14.	"Densaa Bushi (デンサー節, Yaeyama: Tradition Song)" (Traditional)	Traditional	Masaaki Uechi	3:56

Limited Edition
No.	Title	Writer(s)	Arranger(s)	Length
15.	"Hana (Live at Hamarikyū Asahi Hall) (花～Live at 浜離宮朝日ホール, Flowers)" (Shoukichi Kina)	Kina	Teruyuki Chinen	4:44

Download Special Edition
No.	Title	Writer(s)	Arranger(s)	Length
15.	"Nada Sōsō (Live at Hamarikyū Asahi Hall) (涙そうそう～Live at 浜離宮朝日ホール, Great Tears Are Spilling)" (Ryoko Moriyama/Begin)	Begin, Moriyama	Chinen	4:43

== Japan sales rankings ==
Release	Chart	Peak position	First week sales	Sales total
March 9, 2007	Oricon Weekly Albums Chart	19	9,862	38,747
