= Ayakaji no Ne =

Studio album by Rimi Natsukawa
- Released: November 23, 2005
- Recorded: 2004–2005
- Genre: J-pop, Shima uta, traditional
- Length: 1:04:19
- Label: Victor Entertainment

Rimi Natsukawa chronology
Rimi Natsukawa Single Collection Vol. 1 (2005)	Ayakaji no Ne (2005)	Rimits: Best Duet Songs (2006)

Singles from Ayakaji no Ne
- 1. "Kokoro Tsutae" Released: December 16, 2004; 2. "Sayōnara Arigatō" Released: November 12, 2005

Ayakaji no Ne (彩風の音, The Sound of Colored Wind) is Rimi Natsukawa's fourth original album, released on November 23, 2005.

== Background ==
"Ayakaji no Ne" was Natsukawa's first album after her first greatest hits album, "Rimi Natsukawa Single Collection Vol. 1". It was preceded by two singles: "Kokoro Tsutae" (ココロツタエ, Heart Legend) in December 2004 and "Sayōnara Arigatō" (さようなら ありがとう, Good-Bye, Thank You) in November 2005. "Sayōnara Arigatō" was re-arranged and re-released after the album as "Sayōnara Arigatō (Ama no Kaze)" (さようなら ありがとう～天の風～, Good-Bye, Thank You (Sky Wind)), and features in this version on her following studio album, "Umui Kaji".

== Collaborations ==
Much like "Kaze no Michi" before it, the album centres on original songs composed by high-profile artists. "Sagaribana" was written by Hitoshi Uechi of Begin, "Sayōnara Arigatō" was written by Kentarō Kobuchi of Kobukuro, "Shinobu Hana" by Kazufumi Miyazawa of The Boom, "Kokoro Tsutae" by singer-songwriter Shinji Tanimura and "Chiharu-zaka" by Okinawan singer-songwriter Yasukatsu Ōjima.

Many of the songs were in collaboration with artists previously worked with. "Shimadachi" was written by Tetsuya Murakami of The Gospellers (Natsukawa collaborated with Gospellers members Yutaka Yasuoka and Kaoru Kurosawa on her former album "Kaze no Michi"). "Tamachiyu no Ashibi" was written in collaboration with Parsha Club guitarist Masaaki Uechi ("Tsuki no Niji" on Kaze no Michi was written by him also).

"Koi Uta" had its lyrics written by Ryoko Moriyama, and "Unai-jima" had lyrics by Misako Koja (Natsukawa covered their songs "Nada Sōsō"/"Dare ni mo Ienai Kedo" and "Warabigami"/"Kui nu Hajimi" respectively).

"Ai no Chikara" was a collaboration between two famous Okinawan singers, lyrics by Mamoru Miyagi and music by Johnny Ginowan.

"Tokotowa no Uta" was written by Chikuzen Sato (leader of band Sing Like Talking) and Departures' screenwriter Kundō Koyama.

== Track listing ==
No.	Title	Writer(s)	Arranger(s)	Length
1.	"Sagaribana (サガリバナ, Cornbeefwood)"	Hitoshi Uechi	Seiichi Kyōda	4:48
2.	"Daijōbu (大丈夫, All-right)"	Chiharu	Kyōda	5:42
3.	"Sayōnara Arigatō (さようなら ありがとう, Good-Bye, Thank You)"	Kentarō Kobuchi	Kyōda	4:47
4.	"Shimadachi (シマダチ, Island Friend)"	Tetsuya Murakami	Takeshi Senoo	5:31
5.	"Tokotowa no Uta (とことわのうた, Everlasting Song)"	Kundo Koyama, Chikuzen Sato	Kyōda	4:17
6.	"Amefuri no Ki no Shita de (雨降樹の下で, Under a Tree in the Rain)"	Masayo Sasaki, Kyōda	Kyōda	4:07
7.	"Tamachiyu no Ashibi (玉露のあしび, Pale Green Japanese andromeda)"	Toshiaki Arashiro, Masaaki Uechi	Satoshi Nakamura	5:24
8.	"Chiharu-zaka (千春坂, Chiharu Hill)"	Yasukatsu Ōjima	Kyōda	4:04
9.	"Koi Uta (恋唄, Love Song)"	Ryoko Moriyama, Chuei Yoshikawa	Kyōda	4:14
10.	"Ai no Chikara (愛のチカラ, The Power of Love)"	Mamoru Miyagi, Johnny Ginowan	Nakamura	7:15
11.	"Shinobu Hana (しのぶ花, Squirrel's-foot Fern Flower)"	Kazufumi Miyazawa	Kyōda	5:06
12.	"Kokoro Tsutae (ココロツタエ, Heart Report)"	Shinji Tanimura	Akira Senju	4:23
13.	"Unai-jima (Yaeyama Version) (ウナイ島 ～八重山バージョン～, Sisters' Island (Yaeyama Version))"	Misako Koja, Kazuya Sahara	Kyōda	4:41

== Japan sales rankings ==
Release	Chart	Peak position	First week sales	Sales total
November 23, 2005	Oricon Weekly Albums Chart	48	5,864	16,158
