= Rimi Natsukawa Single Collection Vol. 1 =

Compilation album by Rimi Natsukawa
- Released: March 6, 2005
- Recorded: 2001–2004
- Genre: J-pop, Shima uta, traditional
- Length: 1:06:42
- Label: Victor Entertainment

Rimi Natsukawa chronology
Kaze no Michi (2004)	Rimi Natsukawa Single Collection Vol. 1 (2005)	Ayakaji no Ne (2005)

Rimi Natsukawa Single Collection Vol. 1 (夏川りみ Single Collection Vol.1) is a singles collection album released by Rimi Natsukawa on March 6, 2005.

== Contents ==
The album features Natsukawa's first seven singles with Victor Entertainment, along with seven B-sides from these singles. For "Yūbae ni Yurete," "Hana ni Naru" and "Tori yo," this is the first album release that they have appeared.

Natsukawa's single "Kokoro Tsutae" (ココロツタエ, Heart Report) does not feature on the single collection, despite being released a month before it.

== Track listing ==
No.	Title	Writer(s)	Arranger(s)	Length
1.	"Yūbae ni Yurete (夕映えにゆれて, Swaying in the Sunset)"	Neko Oikawa, Takashi Tsushimi	Masaki Iwamoto	4:51
2.	"Sayonara o Dakishimete (サヨナラを抱きしめて, Hold Goodbyes)"	Chihiro Fuyumi, Youki Asano	Iwamoto	4:28
3.	"Hana ni Naru (花になる, Become a Flower)"	Mami Takubo, Tsushimi	Tomoji Sogawa	5:10
4.	"Kono Hoshi o Kanjite (この星を感じて, Feeling This Star)"	Aki, Mike Kent	Reijirō Koroku	5:10
5.	"Nada Sōsō (涙そうそう, Great Tears Are Spilling)"	Begin, Ryoko Moriyama	Seiichi Kyōda	4:18
6.	"Anata no Kaze (あなたの風, Your Wind)"	Begin	Kyōda	4:20
7.	"Michishirube (道しるべ, Signpost)"	Chiharu	Chuei Yoshikawa	4:25
8.	"Gettōka (月桃花, Pink porcelain lily)"	Mari Hayama, Yoshikawa	Kyōda	4:46
9.	""Tori yo" (鳥よ, Bird)"	Megumi Ayukawa, Masaaki Uechi	Kyōda	5:07
10.	""Natsu no Kioku" (ナツノキオク, Summer Memories)"	Toshiaki Arashiro, Uechi	Kyōda	4:40
11.	"Warabigami (Yamatoguchi) (童神～ヤマトグチ～, Little God (Standard Japanese))"	Misako Koja, Kazuya Sahara	Kyōda	4:45
12.	"Famureuta (ファムレウタ（子守唄）, Lullaby)"	Yukito Ara, Uechi	Kyōda	4:15
13.	"Hohoemi ni Shite (微笑みにして, Make a Smile)"	Midori Karashima	Kyōda	4:39
14.	"Kana yo Kana yo (愛よ 愛よ, Love Love)"	Kazufumi Miyazawa	Miyazawa	4:36

== Japan sales rankings ==
Release	Chart	Peak position	First week sales	Sales total
March 16, 2005	Oricon Weekly Albums Chart	13	17,232	148,198
