= Kaze no Michi =

Studio album by Rimi Natsukawa
- Released: September 22, 2004
- Recorded: 2004
- Genre: J-pop, Shima uta, traditional
- Length: 52:59
- Label: Victor Entertainment

Rimi Natsukawa chronology
| Okinawa no Kaze (2004) | Kaze no Michi (2004) | Rimi Natsukawa Single Collection Vol. 1 (2005) |

Singles from Kaze no Michi
- 1. "Kana yo Kana yo" Released: July 21, 2004

Kaze no Michi (風の道, Wind Road) is Rimi Natsukawa's third original album, released on September 22, 2004.

== Background ==
Kaze no Michi was Natsukawa's first original album since 2003's Sora no Keshiki, in between which she released two cover albums. The album was preceded by the single "Kana yo Kana yo," written and produced by Kazufumi Miyazawa of The Boom.

== Collaborations ==
The album, unlike most of her former releases, centres around original songs. Many of these songs are collaborations with famous musicians/songwriters. "Aitakute" was written by members of The Gospellers, "Shiahō: Xie He" was written by Chinese composer Liang Jian Feng (musical director/composer for Twelve Girls Band) and "Hyakuman no Hoshi" had music composed by Korean singer/songwriter Yang Jeong Seung (Kiroy Y).

== Track listing ==
| No. | Title | Writer(s) | Arranger(s) | Length |
|---|---|---|---|---|
| 1. | "Aitakute (会いたくて, I Miss You)" | Yutaka Yasuoka, Kaoru Kurosawa | Seiichi Kyōda | 5:23 |
| 2. | "Kana yo Kana yo (愛よ 愛よ, Love Love)" | Kazufumi Miyazawa | Miyazawa | 4:37 |
| 3. | "Toki (時, Time)" | Yuho Iwasato, Kazuhiro Hara | Kyōda | 4:29 |
| 4. | "Shiahō: Xie He (夏河～シアホー, Summer River)" | Iwasato | Liang Jian Feng | 4:56 |
| 5. | "Hyakuman no Hoshi (百万の星, A Million Stars)" | Iwasato | Mwun Hye Ji, Yang Jeong Seung | 4:31 |
| 6. | "Zutto, Oboeteru (ずっと、憶えてる, I'm Remembering More and More)" | Iwasato | Satoshi Nakamura | 4:58 |
| 7. | "Tenohira no Umi (掌の海, Sea of Palms of Hands)" | Miyazawa | Kyōda | 4:17 |
| 8. | "Yuimaaru (ゆいま～る, Okinawan: Support Each Other)" | Maya Nekoda, Rimi | Chuei Yoshikawa | 4:51 |
| 9. | "Ashita no Kimi e (明日の君へ, To the You of Tomorrow)" | Miyuki Noyori, Kenji Hazama | Nakamura | 4:49 |
| 10. | "Umi no Temaneki (海の手招き, The Calling of the Sea)" | Kei Ogura, Zhang Bin | Kyōda | 4:49 |
| 11. | "Tsuki no Niji (月の虹, Moon Rainbow)" | Toshiaki Arashiro, Masaaki Uechi | Yoshikawa | 4:49 |

== Japan sales rankings ==
| Release | Chart | Peak position | First week sales | Sales total |
|---|---|---|---|---|
| September 22, 2004 | Oricon Weekly Albums Chart | 36 | 8,216 | 30,113 |
