= Famureuta =

EP by Rimi Natsukawa
- Released: October 22, 2003
- Recorded: 2003
- Genre: J-pop, Shima uta, traditional
- Length: 29:58
- Label: Victor Entertainment

Rimi Natsukawa chronology
Sora no Keshiki (2003)	Famureuta (2003)	Okinawa no Kaze (2004)

Singles from Famureuta
- 1. "Warabigami (Yamatoguchi)" Released: September 26, 2003

Famureuta (ファムレウタ～子守唄～, Yaeyama: Fāmurēuta "lullaby") is Rimi Natsukawa's second EP, released on October 22, 2003. It consists solely of recordings on lullabies. It is her second EP that solely features cover songs.

== Background ==
The title comes from the song "Famureuta" (ファムレウタ（子守唄）, Lullaby), which featured on Natsukawa's debut album "Tida: Tida Kaji nu Umui." The album was preceded with the single "Warabigami (Yamatoguchi)" (童神～ヤマトグチ～, Little God), a standard Japanese version of the Misako Koja song she covered on her 2002 EP "Minamikaze." "Famureuta" featured as the B-side of this single. The version of "Warabigami" appearing on the single is not on the album, however, a re-arranged duet version with Misako Koja appears instead.

== Song sources ==
The songs are lullabies from around Asia. "Warabigami" and "Famureuta" are songs released by Okinawan musicians (Misako Koja, Parsha Club). Two are lullabies from other regions of Japan ("Chūgoku Chihō no Komoriuta," "Shimabara no Komoriuta"). The Chūgoku one is traditional, while the Shimabara one was written by Kohei Miyazaki (宮崎康平) in the 1950s (popularised by enka singer Chiyoko Shimakura).

"Māmāhō" is a cover of "Mama Hao (媽媽好 Mama's the Best)," a song sung by Josephine Siao in the 1960 Chinese film Kuer Liulang Ji (苦兒流浪記, No Body's Child). "Ten no Komoriuta" is a cover of Mongolian singer Oyunaa's debut Japanese single of the same name, released in 1990. "Chājanga" is a cover of Jajangga (자장가 Lullaby), a traditional Korean lullaby.

== Track listing ==
All songs arranged by Seiichi Kyōda.

No.	Title	Lyrics	Music	Length
1.	"Warabigami (Tida Chichi Version) (童神～太陽・月バージョン～, Little God (Sun, Moon Version))" (with Misako Koja)	Koja	Kazuya Sahara	4:46
2.	"Chūgoku Chihō no Komoriuta (中国地方の子守歌, Chūgoku Region Lullaby)"	Traditional	Kosaku Yamada	3:32
3.	"Māmāhō (マーマーホー, Mama's the Best)"	Li Jun Qing, Eiko Kyo (Japanese translation)	Liu Hong Yuan	3:21
4.	"Ten no Komoriuta (天の子守歌, Sky Lullaby)"	Erudenechiechegu, Kōnosuke Fuji (Japanese translation)	Oyunaa	5:04
5.	"Shimabara no Komoriuta (島原の子守歌, Shimabara Lullaby)"	Kohei Miyazaki	Miyazaki	4:06
6.	"Chājanga (チャーヂャンガ, Lullaby)"	Mwun Hye Ji	Traditional	4:52
7.	"Famureuta (子守唄, Lullaby)"	Yukito Ara	Masaaki Uechi	4:17

== Japan sales rankings ==
Release	Chart	Peak position	First week sales	Sales total
October 22, 2003	Oricon Weekly Albums Chart	25	9,535	44,783
