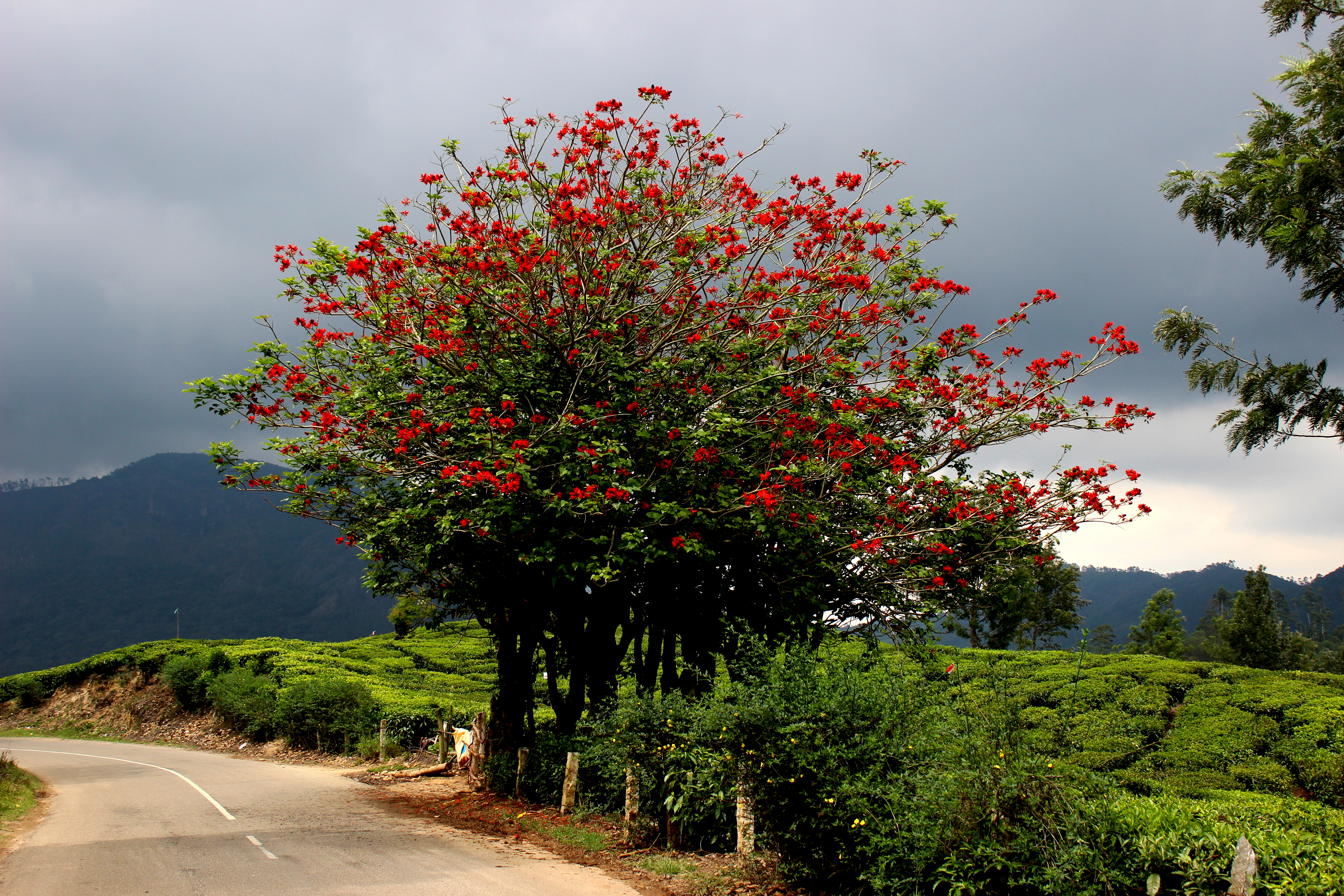
- Tree in Munnar, Kerala, India.

Conservation status
- Least Concern (IUCN 3.1)

Scientific classification
- Kingdom: Plantae
- Clade: Tracheophytes
- Clade: Angiosperms
- Clade: Eudicots
- Clade: Rosids
- Order: Fabales
- Family: Fabaceae
- Subfamily: Faboideae
- Genus: Erythrina
- Species: E. variegata

Binomial name
- Erythrina variegata L.

= Erythrina variegata =

Species of tree

Erythrina variegata, commonly known as tiger's claw or Indian coral tree, is a species of Erythrina native to the tropical and subtropical regions of eastern Africa, the Indian subcontinent, northern Australia, and the islands of the Indian Ocean and the western Pacific Ocean east to Fiji.

== Description ==
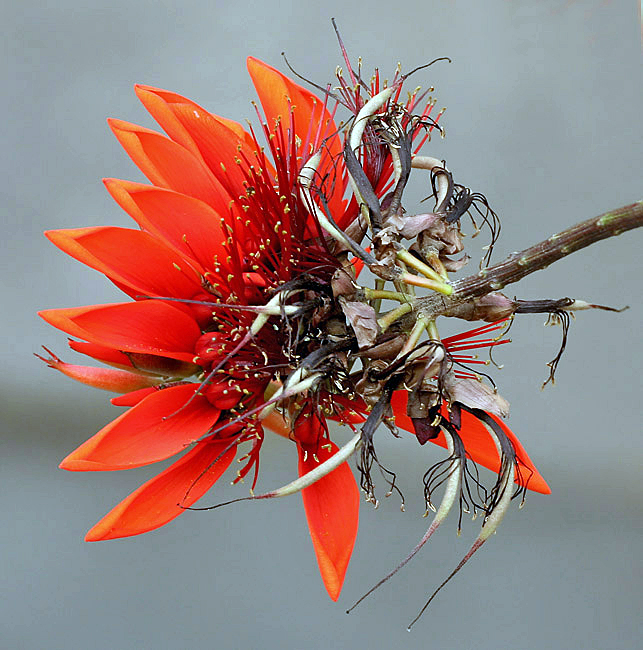
Flower in Kolkata, India

E. variegata is a thorny deciduous tree growing to 27 m (89 ft) tall. The leaves are pinnate with a 20 cm (7.9 in) petiole and three leaflets, each leaflet up to 20 cm (7.9 in) long and broad. It has dense clusters of scarlet or crimson flowers and black seeds.

Notably, crows have been observed contributing to the pollination of the Indian coral tree by feeding on its nectar-rich flowers.

== Uses ==
Erythrina variegata is valued as an ornamental tree. Several cultivars have been selected, including 'Alba' with white flowers.

In Vietnam, the leaves are used to wrap fermented meat (Vietnamese: nem).

E. variegata is known as dapdap in many languages of the Philippines where its bark and leaves are used in alternative medicine.

E. variegata is often used in agroforestry systems. It can be used for fodder as its foliage has a good nutritive value for most livestock.

The seeds are poisonous in their raw state but can be cooked and eaten. Along with the bark, the seeds were used to stupefy fish, making them easier to catch.

The Formosan aboriginal Puyuma tribe carve a mortar called a taur from the trunk of the tree. It is used for pounding sticky rice that is later to be steamed.

== Cultural impact ==
E. variegata was designated the official flower of Okinawa Prefecture in 1967. The deigo flower features in the popular song "Shima Uta" by The Boom, one of the most well-known songs associated with Okinawa. In addition, the use of the wood of the deigo tree is one of the unique characteristics of Ryukyuan lacquerware.

In Sri Lanka, the blossoming flowers of the tree are associated with the advent of the Sri Lankan (April) New Year. This plant is known as Erabadu (Sinhala: එරබදු) in Sinhalese.

In Fiji —known as drala, drara or rara— its flowering season marks the traditional time to plant taro. In Mangaia, it marks the arrival of kingfishers and the nesting of black-winged petrels.

== Role in ecosystem ==
Fiji crested iguanas can be found within Erythrina variegata ("rara") trees.

== Gallery ==
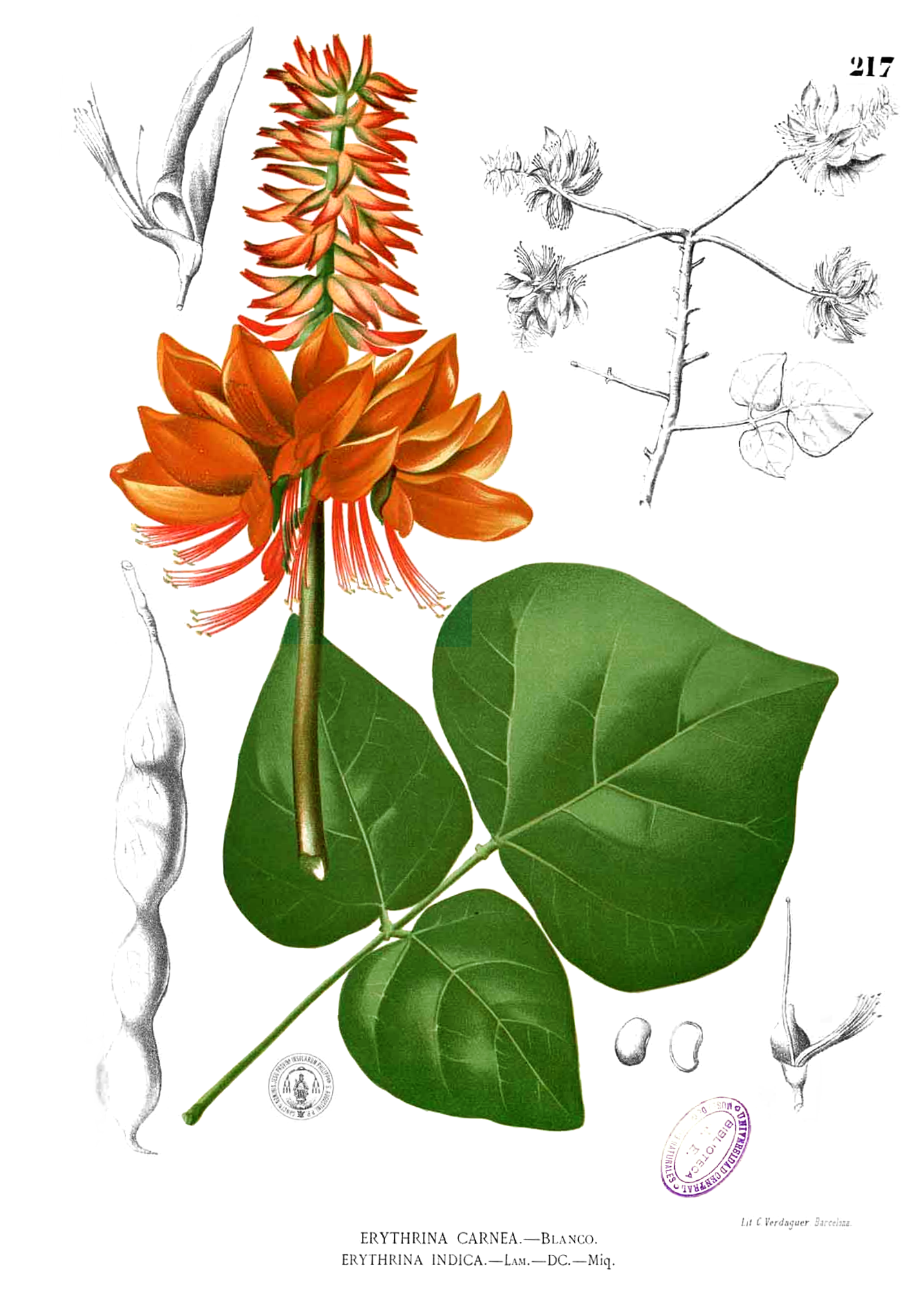
Botanical illustration

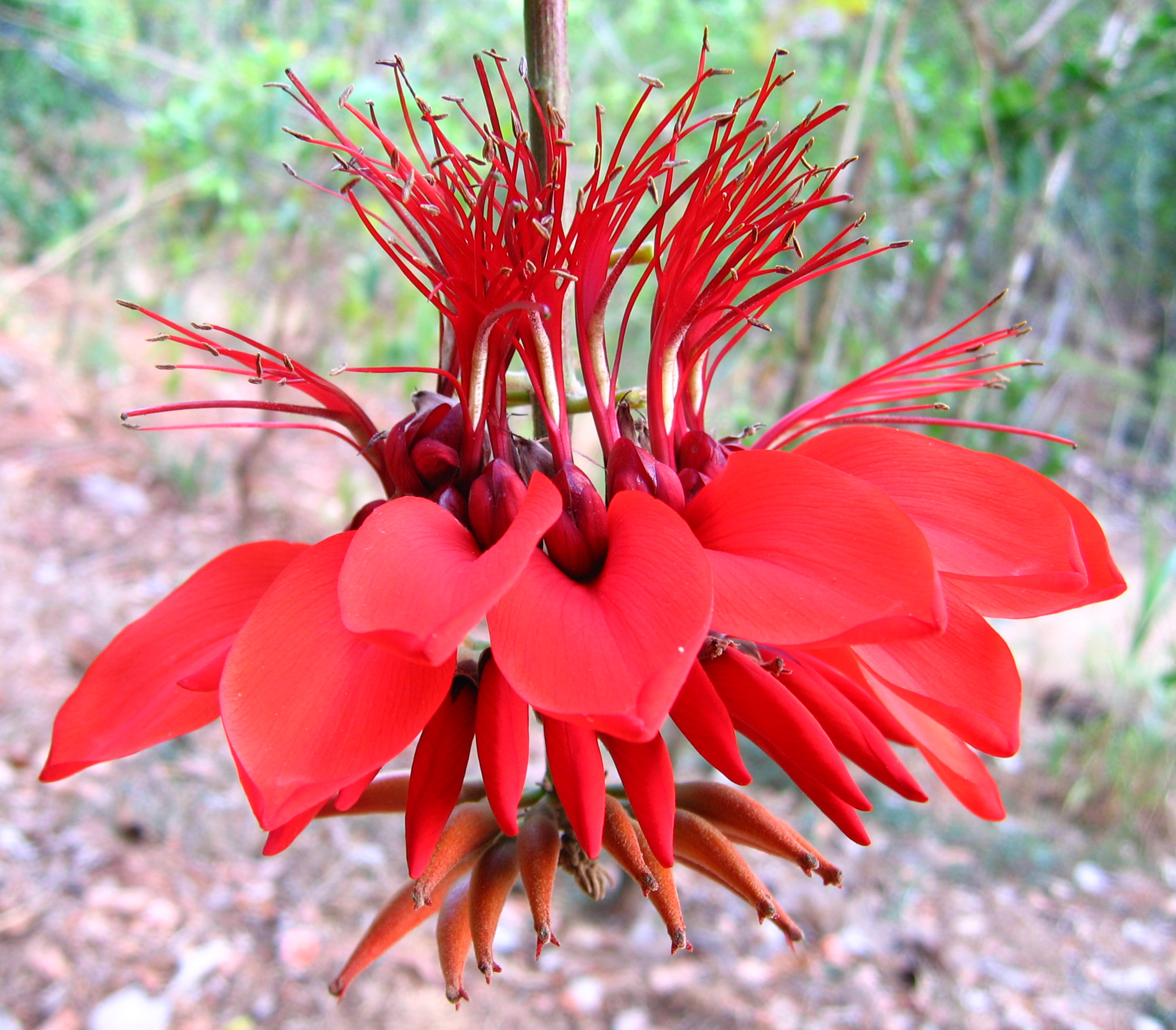
Flower

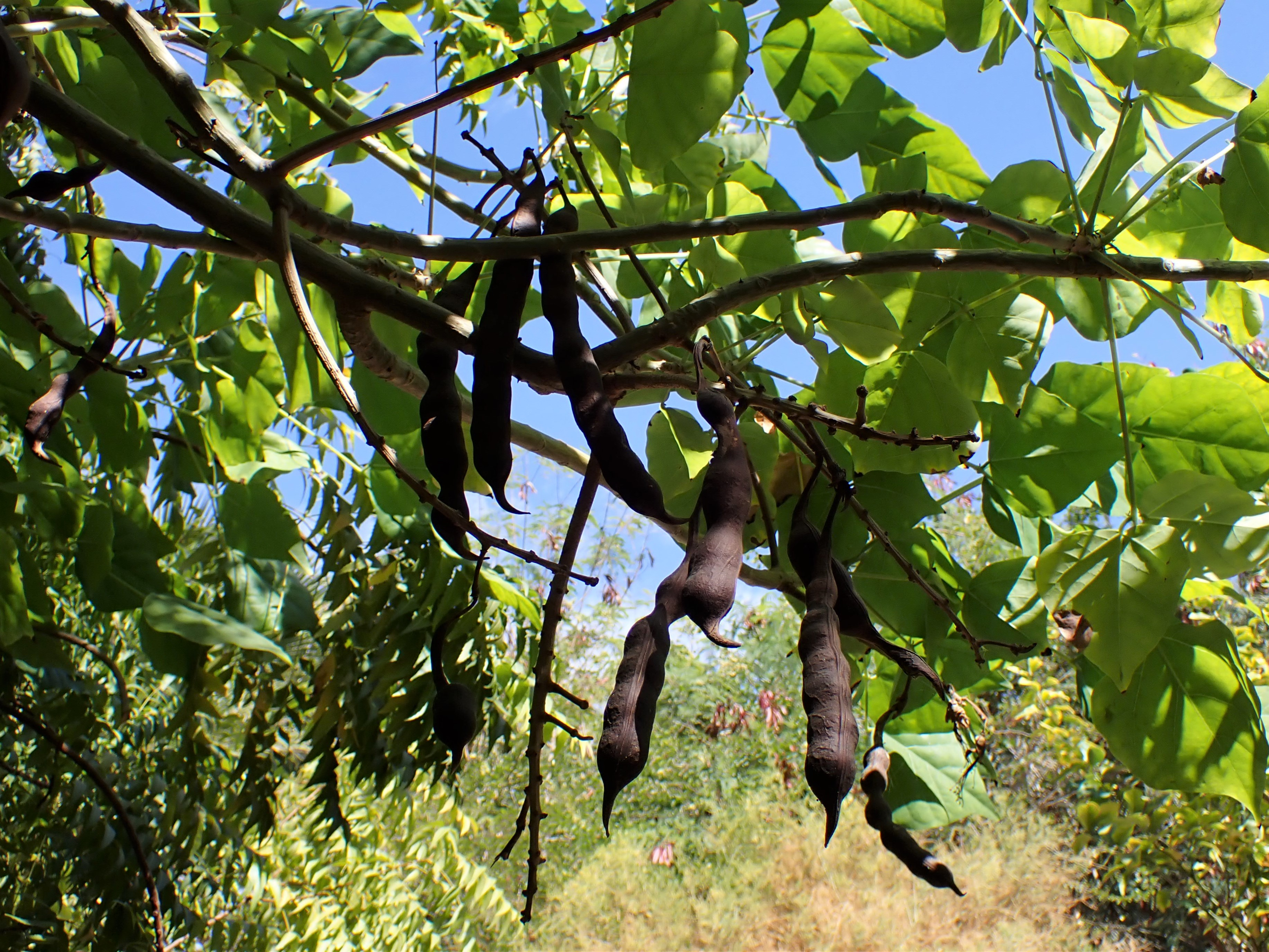
Seed pods

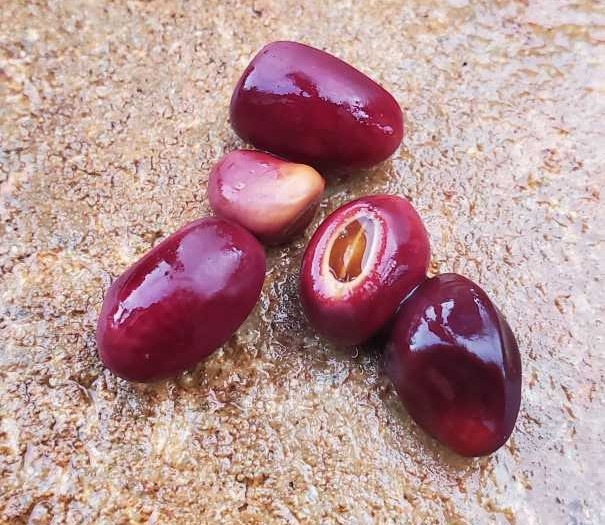
Seeds. Hilton Resort, Guam

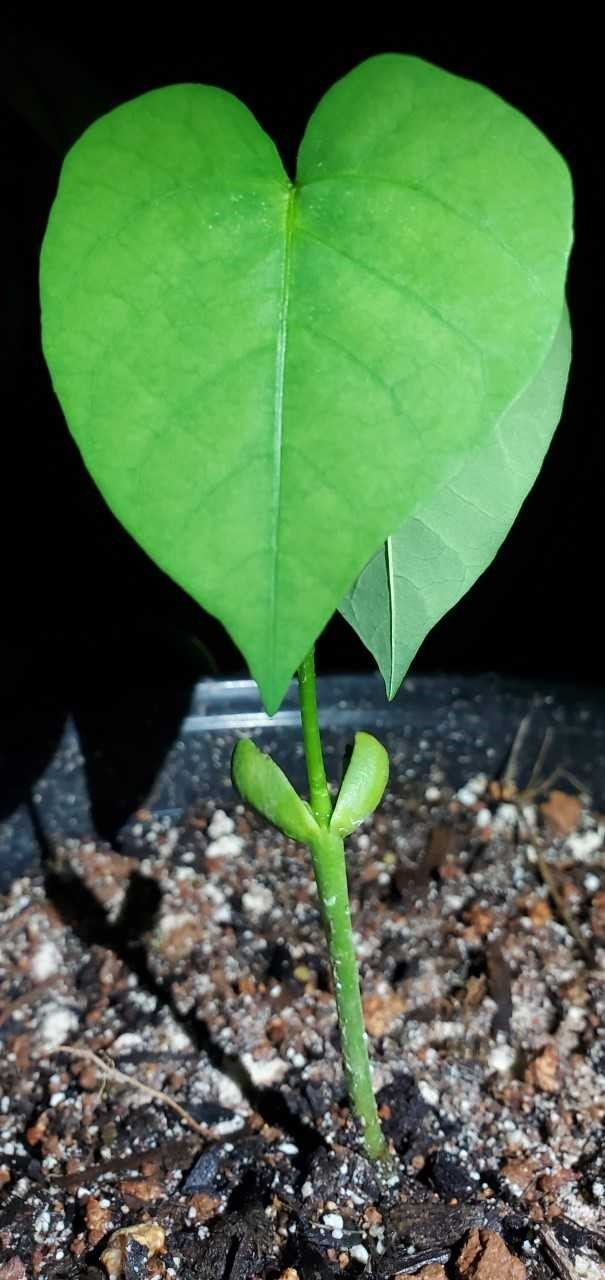
Seedling. Dededo, Guam

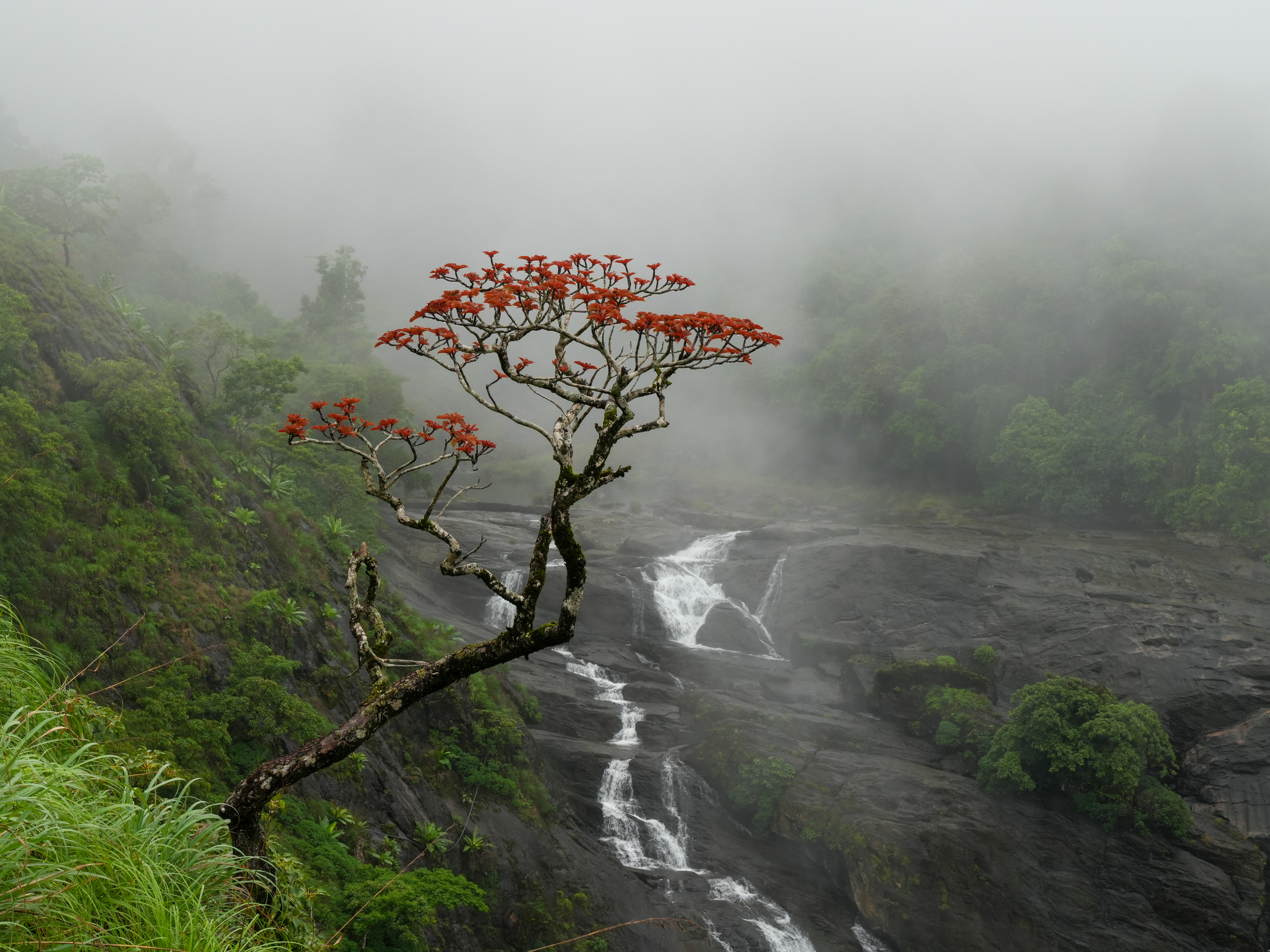
Tree at Mallalli Falls, Hassan, Karnataka

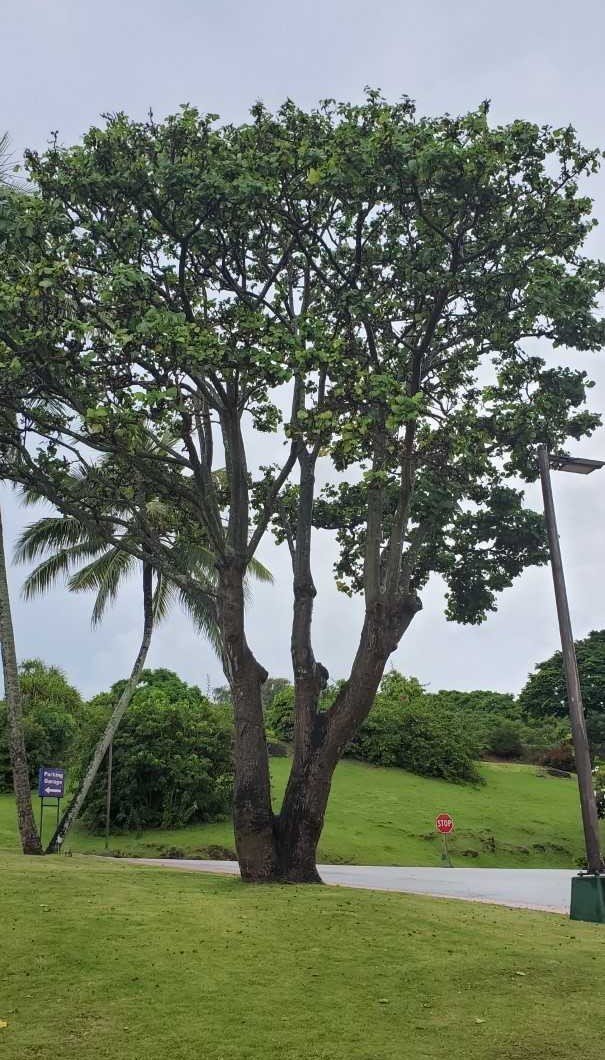
Mature tree. Hilton Resort, Tumon, Guam
