= Sora no Keshiki =

Studio album by Rimi Natsukawa
- Released: March 26, 2003
- Recorded: 2002–2003
- Genre: J-pop, Shima uta, traditional
- Length: 54:12
- Label: Victor Entertainment

Rimi Natsukawa chronology
Tida: Tida Kaji nu Umui (2002)	Sora no Keshiki (2003)	Famureuta (2003)

Singles from Sora no Keshiki
- 1. "Nada Sōsō (Special Live Version)" Released: March 12, 2003; 2. "Michishirube" Released: March 19, 2003

Sora no Keshiki (空の風景, A View of the Sky) is Rimi Natsukawa's second album, released on March 26, 2003.

== Background ==
Two singles were released before the album, "Nada Sōsō (Special Live Version)" and "Michishirube." The special live version was sung with Begin and Ryoko Moriyama, who wrote the song.

== Song sources ==
Unlike her first album and EP, Tida: Tida Kaji nu Umui and Minamikaze, the majority of the songs are original compositions. "Manten no Hoshi" and "Dare ni mo Ienai Kedo" are covers of popular music tunes by Parsha Club and Ryoko Moriyama. "Shimajima Kaisha" was originally by Okinawan band Nenes. "Satōkibi-batake" is a cover of a written by Naohiko Terashima in the 1960s, and "Tuki nu Kaisha" is a traditional Okinawan song.

== Track listing ==
No.	Title	Writer(s)	Arranger(s)	Length
1.	"Manten no Hoshi (満天の星, Sky Full of Stars)"	Toshiaki Arashiro, Masaaki Uechi	Seiichi Kyōda	4:27
2.	"Michishirube (道しるべ, Signpost)"	Chiharu	Chuei Yoshikawa	4:26
3.	"Sa La La (サ・ラ・ラ)"	Rimi, Natsumi Hirai	Kyōda	5:08
4.	"Haruka... (遥か..., Far Away)"	Kazuhiro Hara	Kyōda	5:08
5.	"Satōkibi-batake (さとうきび畑, Sugarcane Field)"	Naohiko Terashima	Kyōda	7:51
6.	"Enpitsuga no Hitomi (鉛筆画の瞳, Pencil Sketch Eyes)"	Osami Okamoto, Yoshikawa	Yoshikawa	4:45
7.	"Dare ni mo Ienai Kedo (誰にも言えないけど, I Haven't Told Anyone, But)"	Ryoko Moriyama	Kyōda	5:00
8.	"Shimajima Kaisha (島々清しゃ, Purity of the Islands)"	Hitoshi Kume, Tsuneo Fukuhara	Kyōda	5:01
9.	"Tsuki nu Kaisha (月ぬ美しゃ, Beauty of the Moon)"	Traditional	Kyōda	4:03
10.	"Itoshii Hito e (いとしい人へ, To My Dear)"	Megumi Ayukawa, Akira Senju	Kyōda	4:03
11.	"Nada Sōsō (Special Live Version) (涙そうそう, Great Tears Are Spilling) (with Begin, Ryoko Moriyama)"	Begin, Ryoko Moriyama	Kyōda	4:23

== Japan sales rankings ==
Release	Chart	Peak position	First week sales	Sales total
March 26, 2003	Oricon Weekly Albums Chart	39	10,583	78,900
