= Oyunaa =

Mongol singer

D. Oyuntulhuur (Mongolian: Дамдинсүрэнгийн Оюунтүлхүүр, born 10 November 1975) better known by the stage name Oyunaa (Оюунаа), is a Mongolian singer based in Japan.

Oyunaa won the Grand Prix at the World Children's Music Festival in Tokyo in 1989. In 1996, Oyunaa returned to Ulaanbaatar to play a benefit concert at the Central Cultural Palace, raising more than $70,000 for homeless children, single parents, low-income families, and spring fire and flood victims.
