= Kiroro =

Japanese pop duo

Kiroro キロロ
- Kiroro in 2004.

Background information
- Origin: Okinawa, Japan
- Genres: J-pop
- Years active: 1996–present
- Label: Victor Entertainment
- Members: Chiharu Tamashiro (玉城 千春); Ayano Kinjō (金城 綾乃)
- Website: Kiroro official web site

Kiroro (キロロ) is a Japanese pop duo from Yomitan, Okinawa that debuted in 1996.

== History ==
Kiroro debuted in 1996 as an independent band, and later made their major debut in 1998 with the song "Nagai Aida (長い間)". They performed on Kōhaku Uta Gassen in 1998, 1999 and 2001.

The ending theme for the Japanese dub of The Good Dinosaur was contributed by them, and was a newly rerecorded "Mother Earth version" of their song "Best Friend".

== Etymology ==
When vocalist Chiharu Tamashiro was in her primary school days, she visited Ikedamachi, Hokkaido, for a regional exchange program. The Ainu language made a deep impression on her. With the Ainu words 'Kiroru' and 'Kiroro-an', Tamashiro and Kinjo decided on the name "Kiroro" for the group; "Kiroru" meaning a wide walking path and "Kiroro-an" meaning "resilient" and "healthy."

The name "Kiroro" however, was already registered in 1981 to the Yamaha Organization in Hamamatsu City, Shizuoka, for the Kiroro Resort in Akaigawa Village, Hokkaido. Victor Entertainment made agreements with the Yamaha organization for use of the name.

== Members ==
Both members are born and raised in Yomitan village in Okinawa Prefecture, Japan:

- Chiharu Tamashiro (玉城 千春, Tamashiro Chiharu; born April 17, 1977 (age 49)) - chorus and vocals
- Ayano Kinjō (金城 綾乃, Kinjō Ayano; born August 15, 1977 (age 49)) - keyboard

== Discography ==
=== Albums ===
- Nagai Aida ~Kiroro no Mori~ (長い間 ～キロロの森～) - October 1, 1998
- Hiruyasumi (昼休み) - September 22, 1999 (Ayano Kinjo's solo album)
- Suki na Hito ~Kiroro no Sora~ (好きな人 ～キロロの空～) - December 8, 1999
- Nanairo (七色) - September 26, 2000 (concept album)
- Tree of Life - January 13, 2001 (Taiwan), January 24, 2001 (Japan) - the first time (and only time, up to the album Wonderful Days) that the date of release in Taiwan was earlier than Japan
- Kiroro no Uta 1 (Kiroroのうた1) - February 21, 2002
- Four Leaves Clover - December 18, 2002
- Diary - March 3, 2004
- Kaeru Basho (帰る場所) - January 21, 2005 (Okinawa limited edition), June 23, 2005 (national edition, mini album) - dedicated to their homeland, Okinawa; the 'national level' edition also contains an introductory flash clip that describes the places of interest in Okinawa
- Wonderful Days - November 23, 2005
- Kiroro no Ichiban Ii Uta Atsumemashita (キロロのいちばんイイ歌あつめました) - March 29, 2006
- Kiroro no Hōra, Naki Yanda! (キロロのほーら、泣きやんだ!) - March 7, 2007 (played by Ayano, a lullaby album for babies)
- Kiroro no Ichiban Ii Uta Atsumemashita ~10th Anniversary Edition~ (キロロのいちばんイイ歌あつめました～10th Anniversary Edition～) - March 7, 2007 (collector's edition)
- Kodomo to Issho ni Kikitai Kiroro no uta (子供といっしょにききたいキロロのうた) - March 29, 2016
- Aihaberu (アイハベル) - January 24, 2018

=== Singles ===
- "Nagai Aida" (長い間) - January 21, 1998
- "Mirai e" (未来へ) - June 24, 1998
- "Fuyu no Uta" (冬のうた) - November 21, 1998
- "Ao no Jumon" (青のじゅもん) - February 24, 1999
- "Saigo no Kissu" (最後のKiss) - June 23, 1999
- "Suki na Hito" (好きな人) - November 10, 1999
- "Himawari" (ひまわり) - March 23, 2000
- "Namida ni Sayonara" (涙にさよなら) - July 26, 2000
- "Aitai" (逢いたい) - December 6, 2000
- "Best Friend" - June 6, 2001
- "Aisanai" (愛さない) - August 21, 2002
- "Hitotsubu no Namida" (ひとつぶの涙) - December 4, 2002
- "Bokura no Messēji" (僕らのメッセージ) - November 21, 2003
- "Mou Sukoshi" (もう少し) - January 21, 2004
- "Ikitekoso" (生きてこそ) - July 6, 2005 (Mushiking anime opening theme song)
- "Wasurenai de ~Live at Okinawa '05~" (忘れないで〜Live at OKINAWA '05〜) - October 21, 2005 (with special edition)
- "Shiawase no Tane ~Winter version~" (幸せの種 ～Winter version～) - December 3, 2008
- "Minna Anata wo Aishiteru" (みんなあなたを愛してる) - March 4, 2009 (anime film Chō Gekijōban Keroro Gunsō: Gekishin Dragon Warriors theme song)

Note: All singles from "Nagai Aida" up to "Suki na Hito" were released again on February 21, 2002.

== Personal lives ==
In January 2005, vocalist Chiharu Tamashiro announced that she was engaged. On April 17 (which coincided with her birthday), she and her fiancé entered the family registry. In May, pianist Ayano Kinjo announced her pregnancy and marriage. In July, Tamashiro announced her pregnancy. In September 2005, they held their "four person concert" in Okinawa with the finale, Wasurenaide ("Don't Forget") before their maternal leave. Kinjo gave birth to a daughter in November 2005. Tamashiro gave birth to a son in February 2006. In March 2007, Tamashiro announced her second pregnancy, and in September 2007, she gave birth to a daughter. In August 2008, Kinjo announced her second pregnancy, and she gave birth to a son in March 2009. Also in March 2009, Tamashiro announced her third pregnancy, and she gave birth to another daughter in September 2009. In October 2010, Kinjo announced her third pregnancy, and she gave birth to another son in March 2011. In April 2013, Kinjo divorced her husband. In January 2023, Kinjo announced her remarriage to a guitarist, Yoshimi Katayama from the band Kata-Kana.
