= Shima Uta (The Boom song) =

- Cover of the "Uchinaaguchi Version"

Single by The Boom

from the album Shisyunki
- A-side: "Shima Uta"
- B-side: "Hyakuman Tsubu no Namida"
- Released: December 12, 1992 (Uchinaaguchi Version); June 21, 1993 (Original Version); October 5, 2001 (2001 version); May 22, 2002 (Compilation single); March 20, 2013 (20th anniversary version)
- Recorded: 1992
- Genre: Folk rock, min'yō
- Length: 5:05 (Uchinaaguchi Version); 5:03 (Original Version); 6:18 (20th anniversary version)
- Songwriter: Kazufumi Miyazawa

The Boom singles chronology
"THE BOOM SAKANA BOOKS" (1992)	"Shima Uta" (1992)	"Tsuki Sae mo Nemuru Yoru" (1993)

The Boom singles chronology
"Tsuki Sae mo Nemuru Yoru" (1993)	"Shima Uta (Original Version)" (1993)	"Manatsu no Kiseki" (1993)

Alternate cover
- Cover of the 1993 "Original Version"

"Shima Uta" (島唄; lit. "Island Song") is a 1992 song by the Japanese band The Boom. It was written by the lead singer, Kazufumi Miyazawa, based on his impressions from visiting Okinawa for a photo shoot. It is the band's best selling song, well known throughout Japan and Argentina, and one of the most widely known songs associated with Okinawa although the band members are all from Yamanashi Prefecture. The song uses a mix of modern pop and rock styles as well as min'yō. Okinawan musical instruments and Okinawan vocabulary have been incorporated into the song.

The song itself was used in an advertising campaign for the Xi brand awamori.

== Origin ==
In a 2003 interview for fRoots, Miyazawa explained that he got the idea for the song after speaking with Okinawan survivors of the US invasion of Okinawa during World War II.

...for the first time saw a deeper side of Okinawa. I saw some remains of the war there and visited the Himeyuri Peace and Memorial Museum and learnt about the female students who became like voluntary nurses looking after injured soldiers. There were no places to escape from the U.S. army in Okinawa, so they had to find caves. Although they hid from the U.S. army, they knew they would be searching for them, and thought they would be killed, so they moved from one cave to another. Eventually they died in the caves. I heard this story from a woman who was one of these girls and who survived. I was still thinking about how terrible it was after I left the museum. Sugar canes were waving in the wind outside the museum when I left and it inspired me to write a song. I also thought I wanted to write a song to dedicate to that woman who told me the story. Although there was darkness and sadness in the underground museum, there was a beautiful world outside. This contrast was shocking and inspiring.

— Kazufumi Miyazawa, fRoots, April 2003 issue

In another interview, Miyazawa explained that most Okinawan casualties were not caused by American troops, but by Japan's instructions to commit suicide rather than surrender.

When the United States were about to invade Japan during the Second World War II, the country was instructing people telling them, 'before USA has you, kill yourself'. In Okinawa 200.000 people died. And most of them weren't killed by USA... They hid under the earth.

— Kazufumi Miyazawa, Clarín, 2002

While the song does not specify who the people being separated are, Miyazawa stated in the 2002 interview, "It is about the separation of a man and a woman, a separation that they couldn't control, and didn't want."

== Okinawan influence ==
In fact, the term shima-uta originally refers to traditional folk songs of the Amami Islands. It is not a native term of Okinawa but was introduced from Amami in the 1970s. Uehara Naohiko, Okinawa's influential radio personality and songwriter, borrowed the term from Amami and give a new meaning to the term. He used his radio programs and musical events to popularize the name of shima-uta in Okinawa.

Miyazawa first heard Okinawan-influenced music from Haruomi Hosono in the 1970s. Later, he asked friends to bring him tapes from the island, as Okinawan music was not readily available in Japan. Miyazawa said in the 2003 interview,

There are two types of melody in the song Shima Uta, one from Okinawa and the other from Yamato (Japan). I wanted to tell the truth that Okinawa had been sacrificed for the rest of Japan, and Japan had to take responsibility for that. Actually, I wasn't sure that I had the right to sing a song with such a delicate topic, as I'm Japanese, and no Okinawan musicians had done that. Although Hosono started to embrace Okinawan music into his own music early on, it was in a different way to what I was trying to do. Then I asked [Okinawan rock star and peace activist] Shokichi Kina what he thought I should do about Shima Uta and he said that I should sing it. He told me that Okinawan people are trying to break down the wall between them and Yamato (mainland) Japanese, so he told me I should do the same and encouraged me to release "Shima Uta".

Miyazawa plays the sanshin, the Okinawan precursor to the shamisen, when singing "Shima Uta" in concert.

== Release history ==
There were initially two versions of "Shima Uta" released by The Boom. The first release is the "Uchinaaguchi Version" (ウチナーグチ・ヴァージョン, Uchinaaguchi Vājon) which is sung partly in Japanese and partly in Okinawan (uchinaaguchi), and was released as a single on December 12, 1992. The "Original Version" (オリジナル・ヴァージョン, Orijinaru Vājon) followed on June 21, 1993, and is sung entirely in Japanese, although some words from Okinawan remain (such as ウージ uuji, which means sugarcane). These versions of the song were performed at the 44th annual Kōhaku Uta Gassen.

The Boom periodically re-released "Shima Uta", first on October 5, 2001, as a rearranged version as a double A-side to their song "Kamisama no Hōseki de Dekita Shima" which was later remixed for the band's 2002 album Okinawa: Watashi no Shima. 2002 also saw the release of a new "Shima Uta" single on May 22 which included vocals from Argentine vocalist Alfredo Casero who became famous in his own right for his cover of the song. The Boom with Casero performed this version at the 53rd Kōhaku Uta Gassen. On March 20, 2013, The Boom released a new 20th anniversary version of the song and single.

== Charts ==
The "Uchinaaguchi Version" of "Shima Uta" (1992) reached number 14 on the Oricon Singles Chart. "Shima Uta (Original Version)" (1993) reached number 4 on that chart. The version released by The Boom on 22 May 2002 reached number 10 on that chart.

== Music video ==
The music video for "Shima Uta" was filmed on Okinawa Prefecture's Taketomi Island, with Taketomi Village's "traditional Okinawan" houses featured prominently along with local flora and fauna. For the 20th anniversary version, The Boom returned to Taketomi and filmed local residents, as well as some other notable residents of Okinawa Prefecture, lip syncing the song with Miyazawa's vocals.

== Cover versions ==
The song has been covered by many artists, including Gackt, Rimi Natsukawa, Tokiko Kato, Alfredo Casero, Plastiko, Diana King, Andrew W.K., Willy Sabor and Allister, as well for Sodagreen.

=== Gackt ===
The Gackt's version features taiko drums, traditional dancers and singers, and China Sadao as sanshin player/min'yō singer.

=== Alfredo Casero ===
The 2001 version by Casero won three awards at Premios Gardel, the "Argentine Grammy Awards." In 2002 the Casero version was voted the theme song for the Argentina football (soccer) team's 2002 FIFA World Cup. A Japanese football fan club, Ultras Nippon, also used Shima Uta as their theme song. "Shima Uta" was the first Argentine hit song to be sung entirely in Japanese. It stayed on the top of the charts for six months. Miyazawa and Casero sing together in concert when Miyazawa tours Brazil and Argentina.

=== Andrew W.K. ===
American musician Andrew W.K. recorded his own version of the song for his album The Japan Covers. It uses the same translation as Izzy Cooper used in her versions, adding the dedication line at the end. He performs the song over synthesizers.

=== Allister ===
Shima Uta can be found on the Japanese version of the 2005 album Before the Blackout, performed in Japanese.
