= The Boom =

Japanese rock band

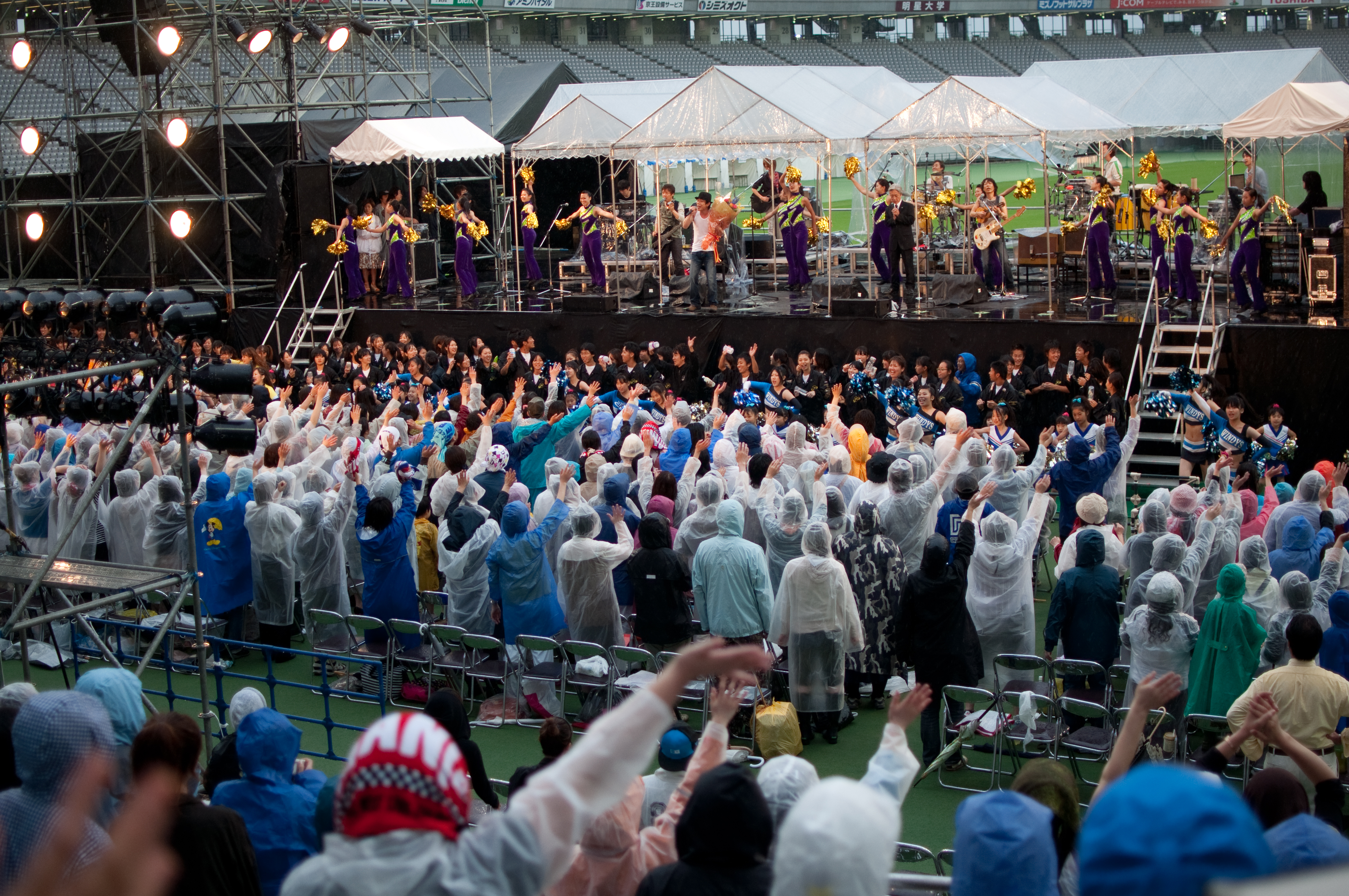
- 2010 concert

Background information
- Origin: Japan
- Genres: Folk rock; ska; jazz fusion
- Years active: 1986–2014
- Labels: Sony Music Entertainment; EMI Music Japan; Avex/Five D Yoshimoto R and C
- Members: Kazufumi Miyazawa; Takashi Kobayashi; Yamakawa Hiromasa; Tochigi Takao
- Website: THE BOOM MUSIC GALLERY

The Boom is a Japanese rock band. Its members are Kazufumi Miyazawa (vocals), Takashi Kobayashi (guitar), Yamakawa Hiromasa (bass guitar), and Tochigi Takao (drums).

== History ==
The four musicians, friends from Yamanashi Prefecture, formed the band in 1986 as a hokoten street band in Tokyo. They soon began getting club gigs and a record deal with Sony, with whom they released their first album, A Peacetime Boom, in 1989.

Vocalist Kazufumi Miyazawa who is the composer and lyricist for The Boom was inspired by the music of Okinawa. A single CD "Shima Uta" was released in 1993 with high sales, which reached approximately 1.5 million and brought fame to the band, around the world as well as at home. On December 31, 1993, The Boom participated in Kōhaku Uta Gassen, an exclusive show usually reserved for elite musicians.

After they released "Shima-uta," the group went on to perform "Kaze-ni Naritai," "Kaero-kana," and "Tsukisaemo-nemuruyoru," but Miyazawa wanted to write more Okinawa songs, so an album composed purely of Okinawa songs was released.

Miyazawa released several solo albums and composed songs for other musicians, including Akiko Yano, Kyōko Koizumi, and Rimi Natsukawa. He also started a new band named Ganga Zumba who released their first album Um in April 2007.

== Discography ==
=== Singles ===
- "Kimi wa TV-kko" (21 May 1989)
- "Hoshi no Love Letter" (21 September 1989)
- "Kikyu ni Notte" (1 December 1989)
- "Tsuri ni Ikou" (21 March 1990)
- "Sakadachi sureba Kotae ga Wakaru" (21 July 1990)
- "Kyofu no Hiruyasumi" (22 May 1991)
- "Michizure" (21 November 1991)
- "Soredake de Ureshii" (2 May 1992)
- "Shima Uta (Uchinaguchi Version)" (12 December 1992)
- "Tsuki sae mo Nemuru Yoru" (21 April 1993)
- "Shima Uta (Original)" (21 June 1993)
- "Manatsu no Kiseki" (21 July 1993)
- "Karatachi Nomichi" (1 October 1993)
- "Yuzai" (21 November 1993)
- "Kaeroukana" (21 October 1994)
- "berangkat -Buranka-" (1 July 1994)
- "Kaze ni Naritai" (24 March 1995)
- "Teida Akara Nami Kirara" (Summer 1995) – Not sold in stores
- "Tegami" (13 December 1995)
- "Toki ga Tateba" (22 May 1996)
- "Chuousen" (21 June 1996)
- "Tsuki ni Furu Ame" (28 April 1999)
- "Osaka de Momareta Otoko" (12 May 1999)
- "Furusato ni Nattekudasai" (8 October 1999)
- "Kamihikoki" (31 December 1999) – Not sold in stores
- "Itsumo to Chigau Basho de" (16 March 2000)
- "Kuchibue ga Fukenai" (4 October 2000)
- "Kamisama no Hoseki de dekita Shima" (5 October 2001)
- "Shima Uta – Shima Uta" (22 May 2002)
- "Kono Machi no Dokoka ni" (5 June 2002)
- "Boku ni Dekiru Subete" (4 December 2002)
- "Kaze ni Naritai" (6 August 2003)
- "Hikari" (5 May 2004)
- "24 Jikan no Tabi" (8 May 2004)
- "Yume kara Samete/All of Everything" (20 May 2009)

=== Albums ===
- A Peacetime Boom (21 May 1989)
- Sairen no Ohisama (1 December 1989)
- JAPANESKA (21 September 1990)
- D.E.M.O. (21 March 1991)
- Shisyunki(Puberty) (22 January 1992)
- THE BOOM (21 September 1992)
- FACELESS MAN (21 August 1993)
- Kyokuto Sanba(Far East Samba) (21 November 1994)
- REMIX MAN '95 (21 April 1995)
- Samba do Extremo Oriente (5 February 1996)
- TROPICALISM-0 (1 July 1996)
- THE BOOM2 (Red) (22 January 1997)
- THE BOOM2 (Blue) (21 March 1997)
- Singles + (27 February 1999)
- No Control (12 May 1999)
- LOVIBE (4 October 2000)
- THE BOOM STAR BOX EXTRA (5 December 2001)
- OKINAWA -Watashi no Shima- (19 June 2002)
- SHIMA UTA -Grandes Exitos- (19 September 2002)
- Singles + a (1 January 2003)
- Hyakkei (30 June 2004)
- 89-09 THE BOOM COLLECTION 1989–2009 (20 May 2009)
