= Rimi Natsukawa =

Japanese singer (born 1973)

Rimi Natsukawa 夏川 りみ
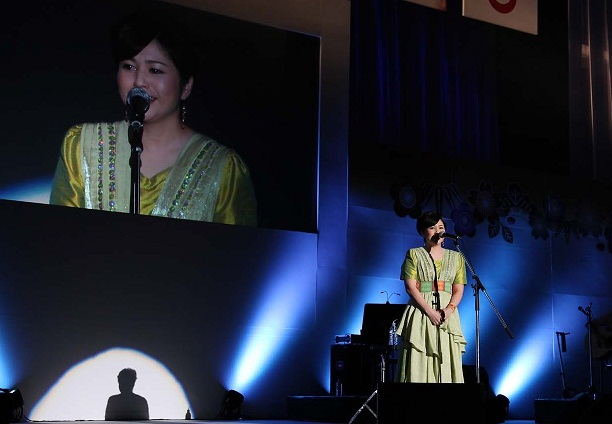
- May 2012
- Born: Rimi Kaneku (兼久 りみ, Kaneku Rimi); 9 October 1973 (age 52); Ishigaki, Okinawa, Japan
- Other names: Misato Hoshi (星 美里, Hoshi Misato); Rimi Tamaki (玉木 りみ, Tamaki Rimi) (married name)
- Occupation: Singer
- Years active: 1989–1992 (as Hoshi Misato); 1999–present
- Musical career
- Genres: J-pop, folk, Yaeyama folk song, Enka
- Labels: Pony Canyon; Victor Entertainment
- Website: www.rimirimi.jp

Rimi Natsukawa (Japanese: 夏川 りみ, Hepburn: Natsukawa Rimi; born 9 October 1973) is a Japanese singer. She is best known for her 2001 single "Nada Sōsō."

== Childhood ==
Natsukawa was born in Ishigaki, the largest city in the Yaeyama Islands chain. From a young age she enjoyed singing, and wanted to be a singer after hearing her father sing Yaeyama folk songs, such as "Tsuki nu Kaisha" (月ぬ美しゃ, Beauty of the Moon) and "Densaa Bushi" (デンサー節, Tradition Song). From age 7, she practiced two hours a day with her father to become an enka singer. At 9, she won a local singing contest (the Chibikko Nodo Jiman Daikai (ちびっこのど自慢大会, Our Tiny Kids' Throats Competition)). Natsukawa continued to win competitions, and in 1984 won the MBS TV show Shirōto Meiji-kai (素人名人会, Amateur Master Meet)'s grand prize. In 1986, she won the Nagasaki Kayōsai (長崎歌謡祭, Nagasaki Song Festival)'s grand prize, and was the youngest person to win this prize at the time.

== Pony Canyon debut ==
Natsukawa, by chance, was scouted shortly after winning the competition at 13 years old. She moved to Tokyo, and started preparing for her debut. She debuted later in 1989 as an enka singer with the name "Misato Hoshi," under Pony Canyon. She released three singles in three years, and did not find much success.

Natsukawa felt defeated after this, and after living for four years in Tokyo, she moved back to Okinawa. She lived with her older sister in Naha, and helped out in her restaurant, singing for patrons daily. As patrons would travel quite a distance to hear her sing, she gradually regained her desire to be a singer.

In 1998, she appeared on an Okinawan radio show called Iwa-chan no Vitamin Radio (岩ちゃんのビタミンラジオ, Rocky's Vitamin Radio) as an assistant.

== Re-debut ==
Natsukawa's musical director from her Pony Canyon days decided to set up a music production company for her, and in 1999 asked if she could return to the capital. She was soon signed under Victor Entertainment, and re-debuted with the single "Yūbae ni Yurete" (夕映えにゆれて, Swaying in the Sunset). She was finding similar success to her debut, as neither of her first singles charted. While watching the news broadcast of the 26th G8 summit held in Okinawa, Natsukawa watched a performance of Okinawan folk band Begin perform a song called "Nada Sōsō." She found she could not get it out of her head, and requested that she could cover the song backstage at a Begin concert. The song was released as her third single in March 2001.

Very slowly and steadily, the song started gaining popularity. It was a hit on Okinawan radio, and in May 2002 (over a year since its release) it first charted in the Oricon top 100 singles charts. Natsukawa released an EP of Okinawan cover songs, Minamikaze, in May, adding to the momentum. By June, the single had broken the top 50, and by July the top 20. Her debut album Tida: Tida Kaji nu Umui was released in September. Natsukawa was asked to perform the song at the 2002 Kōhaku Uta Gassen (New Year's song competition), which made the song break the top 10.

None of these three releases charted very highly, but they all charted extremely gradually. By the time Tida: Tida Kaji nu Umui and Minamikaze stopped charting (roughly two years later), they had sold 280,000/371,000 copies respectively. "Nada Sōsō" stopped charting a total of six years after its release, and sold over 680,000 copies.

Natsukawa released a string of Okinawan song-based released from this time until 2004. One of these, "Warabigami (Yamatoguchi)" (童神～ヤマトグチ～, Little God (Standard Japanese)) (a Misako Koja cover), was nominated for the Japan Record Award. It was Natsukawa's biggest hit since Nada Sōsō, reaching the top 20.

== Original song move ==
In 2004, Natsukawa's music changed to centre more around original songs, with her third album Kaze no Michi (her second, Sora no Keshiki, featured many original songs, but still centred on Okinawan folk songs). She started a trend in her music for collaborating with high-profile musicians (Kazufumi Miyazawa, The Gospellers). Her 2005 follow-up, Ayakaji no Ne, was similar, with Kentarō Kobuchi of Kobukuro writing her single "Sayōnara Arigatō" (さようなら ありがとう, Good-Bye, Thank You). Natsukawa's releases began dropping in sales, with "Sayōnara Arigatō" being her most recent top 50 single, with its 2006 re-release.

In 2006, she released a compilation album, Rimi Natsukawa Selection, that was only for release in non-Japanese Asian countries. The album was a massive success in Taiwan, reaching #1 on the Taiwanese album charts.

In 2007, Natsukawa ended her contract with her production office. She continued to release music under Victor, however, such as her 5th album Umui Kaji.

== Song Search ==
At Natsukawa's concerts and at her website, she began asking for submissions from fans for songs they would like to hear her cover. The result of this was the "Uta Sagashi" (歌さがし, Song Search) project, where Natsukawa worked on covering mainly Japanese popular songs. This resulted in the album Uta Sagashi: Request Cover Album, her most successful release of her material since 2003.

Since this, Natsukawa has continued to release original material and compilations. Her second Uta Sagashi album was released in February 2010, and is her first bilingual Japanese/Chinese album.

== Personal life ==
Natsukawa married percussionist Masaaki Tamaki (玉木正昭, Tamaki Masaaki) on January 1, 2009. Their first child, a boy, was born on August 20, 2010.

== Discography ==
=== Studio albums ===
1. 2002: Tida: Tida Kaji nu Umui
2. 2003: Sora no Keshiki
3. 2004: Kaze no Michi
4. 2005: Ayakaji no Ne
5. 2007: Umui Kaji
6. 2009: Kokoro no Uta

=== Cover albums ===
1. 2002: Minamikaze (EP)
2. 2003: Famureuta (EP)
3. 2007: Uta Sagashi: Request Cover Album
4. 2010: Uta Sagashi: Asia no Kaze

=== Compilation albums ===
1. 2004: Okinawa no Kaze
2. 2005: Rimi Natsukawa Single Collection Vol. 1
3. 2006: Rimits: Best Duet Songs
4. 2006: Rimi Natsukawa Selection
5. 2008: Ai no Uta: Self-Selection Best
6. 2009: Okinawa Uta: Chikyū no Kaze o Kanjite
7. 2010: Misato Hoshi Best Collection

=== Top 50 singles ===
1. 2001: "Nada Sōsō"
2. 2003: "Michishirube"
3. 2003: "Tori yo"
4. 2003: "Warabigami (Yamatoguchi)"
5. 2004: "Kana yo Kana yo"
6. 2004: "Kokoro Tsutae"
7. 2005: "Sayōnara Arigatō"
8. 2006: "Sayōnara Arigatō (Ama no Kaze)/Mirai"
