= Minamikaze =

EP by Rimi Natsukawa
- Released: March 21, 2002
- Recorded: 2001–2002
- Genre: J-pop, Shima uta, traditional
- Length: 35:14
- Label: Victor Entertainment

Rimi Natsukawa chronology
Minamikaze (2002)	Tida: Tida Kaji nu Umui (2002)

Singles from Minamikaze
- 1. "Nada Sōsō" Released: March 23, 2001

Minamikaze (南風, South Wind) is Rimi Natsukawa's debut EP, released on March 21, 2002, consisting of covers of Okinawan songs.

== Background ==
The EP was released after three singles, but only her hit single "Nada Sōsō" features. The album consists of six covers and an original track (Natsukawa's full-length debut album Tida: Tida Kaji nu Umui, released six months later, also followed this pattern).

== Song sources ==
Other than "Nada Sōsō," two other tracks are associated with the Okinawan band Begin who composed the track. "Irayoi Tsukiyohama" (a Yasukatsu Ōjima cover) had its music written by band vocalist Eishō Higa, and has been recorded by the band. "Hana," a Shoukichi Kina song, was recorded by the band on their "Nada Sōsō" single (released a year prior to Natsukawa's version).

"Warabigami" is a Misako Koja cover, "Ōgon no Hana" is a Nenes cover and "Tinsagu nu Hana" is a traditional Okinawan folk song.

== Track listing ==
No.	Title	Writer(s)	Arranger(s)	Length
1.	"Nada Sōsō (涙そうそう, Great Tears Are Spilling)"	Begin, Ryoko Moriyama	Seiichi Kyōda	4:20
2.	"Warabigami (童神)"	Misako Koja, Kazuya Sahara	Chuei Yoshikawa	5:10
3.	"Ōgon no Hana (黄金の花, Green Gold Flower)"	Osami Okamoto, Sadao China	Yoshikawa	4:49
4.	"Irayoi Tsukiyohama (イラヨイ月夜浜, Treasured Moonlit Beach)"	Yasukatsu Ōjima, Eishō Higa	Yoshikawa	5:42
5.	"Tinsagu nu Hana (てぃんさぐぬ花, Balsam Flowers)"	Traditional	Yoshikawa	4:34
6.	"Hana (花, Flowers)"	Shoukichi Kina	Yoshikawa	6:23
7.	"Nada Sōsō (Uchināguchi Version) (涙そうそう（ウチナーグチ・バージョン）, Okinawan Version)"	Begin, Moriyama, Toshiaki Arashiro	Yoshikawa	4:16

== Japan sales rankings ==
Release	Chart	Peak position	First week sales	Sales total
March 21, 2002	Oricon Weekly Albums Chart	37	3,290	370,953
