= Tsuneo Fukuhara =

Japanese composer and music producer (1932–2022)

- 普久原恒勇
- Born: 14 November 1932; Nishiyodogawa-ku, Osaka, Japan
- Died: 1 November 2022 (aged 89); Okinawa, Japan

Tsuneo Fukuhara (Japanese: 普久原恒勇; 14 November 1932 – 1 November 2022) was a Japanese composer and record producer.

== Life and career ==
Born in Osaka, Fukuhara was the adoptive son of composer and record producer Fukuhara Chöki. He spent his early life in Okinawa, and studied classical music at the Osaka College of Music. He is considered a pioneer in fusing traditional Okinawan style with elements from other popular genres such as classical music, rhythm & blues and bossa nova, and his peculiar compositions are known as "Fukuhara Melodies" ("普久原メロディー").

Fukuhara made his professional debut in 1961, and during his career composed over 500 songs. Among his best known compositions is the song "Bashofu" (1965), which was recorded by popular artists such as Rimi Natsukawa and Tokiko Kato. During his career he received various awards and honors, including in 2014 a lifetime JASRAC Music Culture Award. Fukuhara died of aortic stenosis on 1 November 2022, at the age of 89.
