= Yukito Ara =

Japanese singer

Yukito Ara (新良 幸人, Ara Yukito, born 1967) is a Japanese sanshin player and Okinawa min'yō (traditional folk songs) singer.

== Life and career ==
Born on Ishigaki Island in 1967, Yukito learned folk songs and how to play sanshin from his father, a singer of Yaeyama min'yō. He moved to Naha, the capital of Okinawa prefecture, at the age of 18, and began performing live with a band under the name "Yukito Ara with Sandii" (新良幸人ｗｉｔｈサンデー, Ara Yukito with Sandii). They first became known for their live album Haru Natsu Aki chotto Yu ing (春夏秋ちょっと酔ing, "Spring Summer Fall, Getting Drunk a Little").

In 1994, Yukito formed the band Parsha Club, which represented a fusion of folk music (min'yō), pop, and jazz. He continues to perform and record today, and takes part in many jazz, world music, and other collaborations.

== References and notes ==
- Kadekawa, Manabu (ed.). Okinawa Chanpuru Jiten (沖縄チャンプルー事典, "Okinawa Champloo Encyclopedia"). Tokyo: Yamakei Publishers, 2003. p. 25.
