= Nada Sōsō =

2001 single by Ryoko Moriyama

Single by Ryoko Moriyama

from the album Time Is Lonely
- Released: December 5, 2001; March 12, 2003 (special live version)
- Recorded: 1998
- Genre: J-pop, folk song
- Length: 4:07
- Label: Dreamusic
- Composers: Eishō Higa; Masaru Shimabukuro; Hitoshi Uechi
- Lyricist: Ryoko Moriyama
- Producer: Koji Igarashi

Ryoko Moriyama singles chronology
"Yūhi no Naka ni" (2000)	"Satōkibi-batake" / "Nada Sōsō" (2001)	"Nada Sōsō (Special Live Version) with Begin, Rimi Natsukawa" (2003)
"Satōkibi-batake"/"Nada Sōsō" (2001)	"Nada Sōsō (Special Live Version) with Begin, Rimi Natsukawa" (2003)	"Kotoba wa Kaze" (2003)

Alternative cover
- Special Live Version cover

"Nada Sōsō" (涙そうそう; Great Tears Are Spilling) is a song written by Japanese band Begin and singer Ryoko Moriyama. It was first released by Moriyama in 1998, but achieved popularity through the cover version by Rimi Natsukawa in 2001.

== Ryoko Moriyama version ==
The song first appears in Ryoko Moriyama's discography in 1998, as a track on her album Time Is Lonely, an album which did not even break the top 100 Oricon albums chart.

Moriyama re-released the song as the second A-side of the single "Satōkibi-batake/Nada Sōsō" in 2001, after Rimi Natsukawa's version had become popular. In 2003, a single featuring a special live version featuring Moriyama, Begin and Natsukawa was released.

=== Background, writing ===
Moriyama and Begin met after performing at live events together in the late 1990s. Moriyama asked Begin to write her an Okinawan-style song. The song's title on the demo tape she received was "Nada Sōsō," an Okinawan language phrase meaning "large tears are falling" (to compare, the Japanese phrase would be namida ga poroporo kobore ochiru (涙がぽろぽろこぼれ落ちる)). When Moriyama found out the meaning of the phrase, it reminded her of the death of her older brother. She kept the title, and based the lyrics she wrote around these feelings.

The lyrics speak of looking through an old photo-book at pictures of somebody who has died. The protagonist of the song is thankful to them for always encouraging them, and for being happy no matter what. They believe they will meet them again one day, and cries as they send thoughts of sadness and love to that person.

=== Track listing ===
==== Satōkibi-batake/Nada Sōsō ====
All songs arranged by Koji Igarashi.

No.	Title	Lyrics	Music	Length
1.	"Satōkibi-batake (さとうきび畑, Sugarcane Field)"	Naohiko Terashima	Naohiko Terashima	10:20
2.	"Nada Sōsō"	Ryoko Moriyama	Begin	4:10
Total length:				14:30

==== Special live version ====
No.	Title	Lyrics	Music	Length
1.	"Nada Sōsō (Special Live Version) (with Begin, Rimi Natsukawa)"	Ryoko Moriyama	Begin	4:23
2.	"Satōkibi-batake (Yano Rabo Version) (さとうきび畑, Sugarcane Field) (with Akiko Yano)"	Naohiko Terashima	Naohiko Terashima	6:59
Total length:				11:27

=== Chart rankings ===
Release	Chart	Peak position	First week sales	Sales total	Chart run
December 5, 2001; March 12, 2003	Oricon Daily Singles Chart				
December 5, 2001; March 12, 2003	Oricon Weekly Singles Chart	18; 32	2,380; 3,459	127,585; 32,848	57 weeks 23 weeks
December 5, 2001; March 12, 2003	Oricon Yearly Singles Chart				

== Begin version ==
"Nada Sōsō"

Single by Begin

from the album Begin no Shima Uta (Omato-take O) and Begin
- B-side: "'Kariyushi no Yoru, Hana (Live Version)'"
- Released: March 23, 2000
- Genre: J-pop, Shima uta
- Length: 4:00
- Label: Teichiku Records
- Composers: Eishō Higa; Masaru Shimabukuro; Hitoshi Uechi
- Lyricist: Ryoko Moriyama

Begin singles chronology
"Ai o Sutenaide" (1999)	"Nada Sōsō" (2000)	"Sora ni Hoshi ga Aru Yō ni" (2000)

Alternative cover
- Standard version alternative cover

Begin released a self-cover of the song as the band's 18th single on March 23, 2000. It appears on two 2000 albums by Begin: their Okinawan concept album Begin no Shima Uta (Omato-take O) and a regular studio album, Begin. Two versions backed with sanshin appear on Begin no Shima Uta (Omato-take O) (one in Japanese, one in Okinawan), while the regular studio version appears on Begin (and is backed with acoustic guitar and strings).

Begin's version of the song was used as the theme song of Marvelous Entertainment's PlayStation 2 game Inaka Kurashi: Minami no Shima no Monogatari (いなか暮らし～南の島の物語, Rural Life: A Story of the South Island) in 2002.

The single features two B-sides: "Kariyushi no Yoru" (かりゆしの夜, Harmony with Nature Night) and "Hana (Live Version)" (花, Flowers). "Kariyushi no Yoru" also appears on "Begin no Shima Uta (Omato-take O)," and "Hana" is a cover of Okinawan folk rock artist Shoukichi Kina's song "Hana (Subete no Hito no Kokoro ni Hana o)" (花～すべての人の心に花を～, Flowers (Put Flowers in Everyone's Hearts))

=== Track listing ===
No.	Title	Writer(s)	Arranger	Length
1.	"Nada Sōsō"	Begin, Ryoko Moriyama	Mitsuo Hagita	4:00
2.	"Kariyushi no Yoru (かりゆしの夜, Harmony with Nature Night)"	Begin, Yasukatsu Ōshima	Yasukatsu Ōshima	5:00
3.	"Hana (Live Version) (花, Flowers)"	Shoukichi Kina	Begin	5:00
4.	"Nada Sōsō (Karaoke)"	Begin, Ryoko Moriyama	Mitsuo Hagita	4:00
Total length:				18:00

=== Chart rankings ===
Release	Chart	Peak position	First week sales	Sales total	Chart run
March 23, 2000	Oricon Daily Singles Chart				
March 23, 2000	Oricon Weekly Singles Chart	159	596	2,416	4 weeks
March 23, 2000	Oricon Yearly Singles Chart				

== Rimi Natsukawa version ==
"Nada Sōsō"

Single by Rimi Natsukawa

from the album Minamikaze and Tida: Tida Kaji nu Umui
- B-side: "'Anata no Kaze, Hana ni Naru (Acoustic Version)'"
- Released: March 23, 2001; March 23, 2004 (special edition)
- Genre: J-pop, Shima uta
- Length: 4:21
- Label: Victor Entertainment
- Composers: Eishō Higa; Masaru Shimabukuro; Hitoshi Uechi
- Lyricist: Ryoko Moriyama

Rimi Natsukawa singles chronology
"Hana ni Naru" (2000)	"Nada Sōsō" (2001)	"Michishirube" (2003)
"Warabigami (Yamatoguchi)" (2003)	"Nada Sōsō (Special Edition)" (2004)	"Kana yo Kana yo" (2004)

Alternative cover
- Special edition cover

A year after Begin's version, the song was covered by Okinawan singer Rimi Natsukawa as her third single. Her version caused the song to become extremely popular, and is the only version to break the top 10. The song was used in commercials for Japan Post Holdings from 2007 onwards.

Natsukawa first heard the song from the broadcast of the 26th G8 summit held in Okinawa, where Begin had sung the song, and found she could not get the melody out of her head. She requested she cover the song backstage at a Begin concert, to which the band composed the song "Anata no Kaze" for her. She still preferred Nada Sōsō, however, and released both songs her third single.

Due to the song's popularity, it became the focus of the "Nada Sōsō Project" by Japanese television company TBS. The project consists of two dramas released in 2005, "Hiroshima Showa 20 nen 8 Gatsu Muika" and "Nada Sōsō Kono Ai ni Ikite" (涙そうそう この愛に生きて, Living in This Love), and a film "Nada Sōsō" in 2006. Natsukawa's version was used for "Hiroshima Showa 20 nen 8 Gatsu Muika" and "Nada Sōsō," while Moriyama's was used for "Nada Sōsō Kono Ai ni Ikite".

Two B-sides feature on the single. The first, "Anata no Kaze" (あなたの風, Your Wind), was also written by Begin. The second, "Hana ni Naru (Acoustic Version)" (花になる（アコースティック・ヴァージョン）, Become a Flower), is an acoustic version of her previous single. A special version of the single, limited to 30,000 copies, was released in 2004, collecting the four main versions of the song (standard, Okinawan language version, special Moriyama/Begin/Natsukawa live version, instrumental track).

The Rimi Natsukawa version of the song has been certified as a triple platinum ringtone by the RIAJ, as well as a platinum cellphone download.

=== Track listing ===
==== Standard edition (2001) ====
No.	Title	Writer(s)	Arranger	Length
1.	"Nada Sōsō"	Begin, Ryoko Moriyama	Seiichi Kyoda	4:21
2.	"Anata no Kaze (あなたの風, Your Wind)"	Begin	Seiichi Kyoda	4:23
3.	"Hana ni Naru (Acoustic Version) (花になる（アコースティック・ヴァージョン）, Become a Flower)"	Mami Takubo, Takashi Tsushimi	Chuei Yoshikawa	4:57
4.	"Nada Sōsō (Instrumental Version)"	Begin, Ryoko Moriyama	Seiichi Kyoda	4:20
5.	"Anata no Kaze (Instrumental Version)"	Begin	Seiichi Kyoda	4:21
Total length:				22:23

==== Special edition (2004) ====
No.	Title	Arranger	Length
1.	"Nada Sōsō"	Seiichi Kyoda	4:20
2.	"Nada Sōsō (Uchinaaguchi Version)"	Chuei Yoshikawa	4:18
3.	"Nada Sōsō (Special Live Version) (with Begin, Rimi Natsukawa)"		4:25
4.	"Nada Sōsō (Instrumental Version)"	Seiichi Kyoda	4:20
Total length:			23:43

=== Chart Rankings ===
The single is one of the slowest and steadiest selling singles in Japanese history. It began charting in late May 2002, and charted constantly until November 2007. it broke the top 50 in June 2002, and the top 20 in July. From there, it charted between #20-#50 until January 2003. After a performance at the 53rd Kōhaku Uta Gassen, the song reached #8. It stayed within the top 40 until June. The single charted steadily until next year's Kōhaku Uta Gassen, where Natsukawa, Begin and Ryoko Moriyama performed the song together. The single reached #8 again, and stayed within the top 40 until March. The single still continued to chart slowly, between #50 and #200 before breaking the top 50 once again in 2006, after the release of the Nada Sōsō film.

Release	Chart	Peak position	First week sales	Sales total	Chart run
March 23, 2001; March 23, 2004	Oricon Daily Singles Chart				
March 23, 2001; March 23, 2004	Oricon Weekly Singles Chart	8; 54	1,930; 2,615	683,908; 9,411	232 weeks 9 weeks
March 23, 2001; March 23, 2004	Oricon Yearly Singles Chart	87 (2002); 21 (2003); 58 (2004)			

== Other cover versions ==
The song has become a standard for Okinawan folk music, Enka, choir and instrumental musicians. The song has been recorded in cello, erhu, harmonica, harp, guitar, koto, music box, piano and violin versions, amongst others. It has also been covered by Yonashiro Sho 【The Leader of the Japanese boys group (JO1)】‹Pre-Debut cover› and also overseas artists, such as Hawaiian Kealiʻi Reichel (as "Ka Nohona Pili Kai" in Hawaiian) and New Zealander Hayley Westenra, who sung a classical crossover rendition in English, and Korean singer Memory (Maeng Yu Na 맹유나), (as Nunmulee Naeyo (눈물이 나요) in Korean). Two versions in Chinese exist: one by Taiwanese Huang Pin-Yuan (as "Bai Lu Si (Chinese: 白鷺鷥; Pe̍h-ōe-jī: Pe̍h-lêng-si White Heron)" in Taiwanese), and one by Joi Chua (as "Pei Wo Kan Ri Chu (陪我看日出 Watching the Sunrise with Me)" in Mandarin). In Cambodia, this song covered in Khmer by Sokun Nisa and it's called "ចិត្តស្មោះក្នុងខ្លួនមនុស្សក្បត់" (a kindness inside my betrayed lover) in 2007 and 2008. It also performed by Saori Kawabata, Narumi Ii, Kenta Tanahara, Taiki Tokuda and Cambodian musicians whose jointed perform this song at night as its original Japanese song during CJCC (Cambodia-Japan Cooperation Center) Kizuna Festival in 2014. In 2017, the song was covered in Indonesian by Hiroaki Katо featuring Arina Mocca.

- Hiroshi Miyama (2021, album "Kokoro no Uta~ Miyama Hiroshi Jojoka wo Utau")
- Hiroaki Kato (2017, album "Hiroaki Kato")
- Against the Current (2015, album "Gravity" (Japan edition))
- Alan (2009, album "My Life" DVD)
- Tsutomu Aragaki (2005, album "Nuchi du Takara, Okinawa no Kokoro, Heiwa no Inori")
- Teresa Bright (2007, album "Hawaiinawa")
- Cao Xuejing (2003, album "Shima Uta Erhu")
- Joi Chua (2004, album "Sunrise")
- Marié Digby (2009, album "Second Home")
- Taimane Gardner (2005, album "Loco Princess")
- Naoki Gushiken (B-SHOP) (2003, Begin tribute album "Let's Begin!: Omoto-take O Songs")
- Huang Pin-Yuan (2002, album "Jian Dian Qing Ge")
- Infinix (2005, album "Relaxation Asia III: Chikyū no Nami")
- Hiroshi Itsuki (2003, album "Cover & Self Collection: Ofukuro no Komoriuta")
- Ji Ma Ma (2006, album "Kazedayori")
- Juleps (2008, album "Tabidatsu Hi")
- Tokiko Katō (2003, album "Okinawa Jōka")
- Mirei Kitahara (2004, "Love Songs")
- Yōko Masaki (2003, album "Yōko Masaki Zenkyokushū")
- Takeshi Matsubara (2006, album "Sakurabashi kara")
- Memory (2008, EP "She Dreamed that She Was Flying Like a Bird")
- Kanako Minami (2006, album "Kanako no Hajimete no Album")
- Akemi Misawa (2003, single "Tsumugi Koi Uta" B-side)
- Nozomi Miyanishi (2003, album "Chotto Hitori Koto")
- Kaori Mizumori (2003, album "Kayōkikō II: Tottori Sakyū")
- Shinichi Mori (2009, album "Love Music")
- Haruko Nakamura (2003, album "Haruko")
- Shōhei Naruse (2003, album "Shōhei no Omoroi Uta no Sekai")
- Takashi Obara (2003, album "Takashi Obara Best")
- Kealiʻi Reichel (2005, album "Scent of the Islands, Scent of Memories")
- Fuyumi Sakamoto (2004, album "Yōko Masaki Zenkyokushū")
- Yōko Sei (2004, album "Hana to Hoshi to Ai to: Kokoro Furueru Uta")
- Yoshio Tabata (2003, album "Shima Uta 2: Yoshio Tabata")
- Chisako Takashima (2003, album "Around the World")
- Yoshimi Tendo (2005, album "Smile")
- Atsuko Tenma (2005, album "Nemu no Ki no Komoriuta")
- Hideaki Tokunaga (2005, album "Vocalist")
- Twelve Girls Band (2005, album "The Best of Covers")
- Kiyoshi Hikawa (2006)
- Naori Uchida (2005, album "Stylish: Love & Favourite Songs")
- Hayley Westenra (2007, album "Hayley sings Japanese Songs")
- Yanawaraba (2008, album "Nagi Uta")
- Kazuha Yasuda (2003, compilation album "Yūsen Enka Best 16")
- Yilana (2005, album "Birei-teki Ōsōgen")
- Tōru Yohana (2003, compilation album "Ryūkyū Shika")
- Sokun Nisa (2008, Khmer Version in album "RHM CD VOL 342")
- Dr. Metal Factory (2009, album "Cover Metal Now")
- Arina Mocca and Hiroaki Kato (2017, Indonesian Version)
- Solar (2018, Korean version in album "Solar Sensitivity pt.6")
- MAMAMOO (2019, album "4colors")
