= Kazufumi Miyazawa =

Japanese musician

Kazufumi Miyazawa 宮沢和史
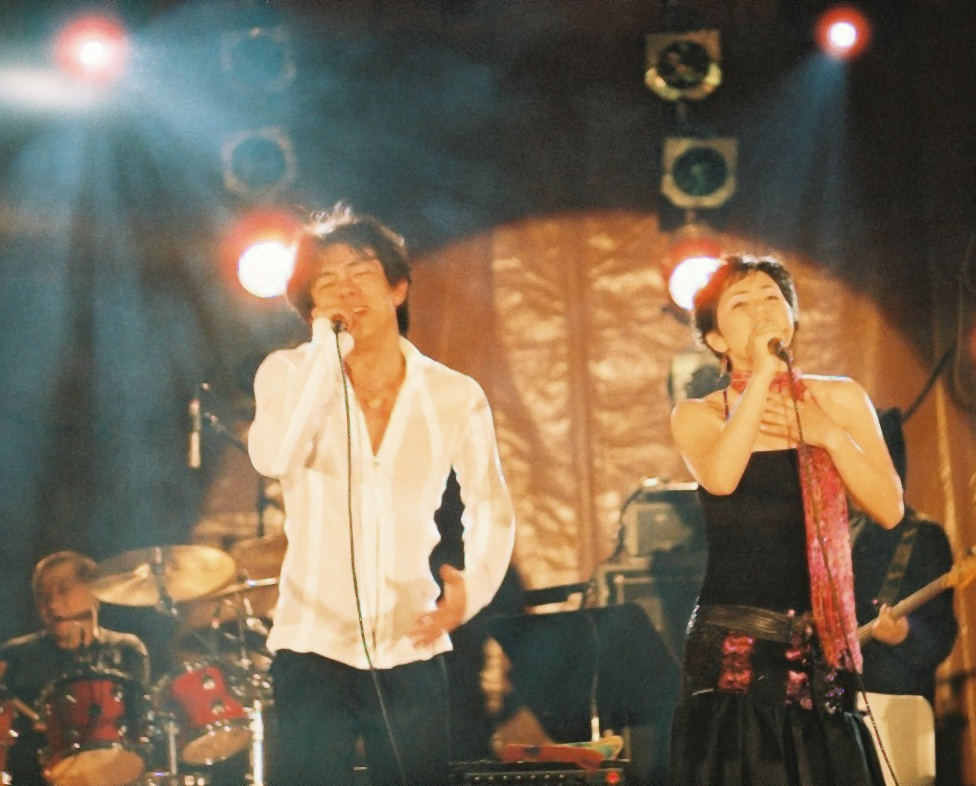
- Miyazawa Sick Band - Kazufumi Miyazawa and Claudia Oshiro - Europe Tour 2005 (Przemyśl)

Background information
- Born: January 18, 1966 (age 60)
- Origin: Yamanashi, Japan
- Occupations: Actor; musician
- Instruments: Vocals, guitar, Sanshin
- Years active: 1989–present
- Website: www.miyazawa-kazufumi.jp

Kazufumi Miyazawa (宮沢和史, Miyazawa Kazufumi; born January 18, 1966) is the founder of the Japanese bands The Boom and Ganga Zumba. The former was noted in the 1990s for a fusion of rock, pop, and local Okinawan folk music. Miyazawa is responsible for virtually all lyrics and music for The Boom, who are best known for their 1993 hit song "Shima Uta".

In 2006, he founded the band Ganga Zumba which includes Marcos Suzano and incorporates Brazilian and other Latin American and Caribbean influences in its music.

== Personal life ==
He married TV personality Dionne Mitsuoka in 1994. He had three children (two boys and a girl). His eldest son, Hio Miyazawa, debuted as a model in 2015 and began his acting career in 2017.

== Discography ==
- 留まらざること 川の如く (Tomarazaru Koto Kawa Nogotoku, 2019) No. 32 Oricon Albums Chart
