= Shoukichi Kina =

Japanese rock musician and politician (b. 1948)

- 喜納 昌吉

Member of the House of Councillors
- In office 26 July 2004 – 25 July 2010
- Constituency: National PR

Personal details
- Born: 10 June 1948 (age 78) Nakagami, Okinawa, USMGR
- Party: Democratic (2004–2014)
- Education: Okinawa International University

Shoukichi Kina (喜納昌吉, Kina Shōkichi; born June 10, 1948 in Koza, Okinawa), is a Japanese rock musician and politician. He, along with his band Champloose, played a large role in the Okinawan home-grown "folk rock" scene in the 1970s and 1980s. His first big hit was "Haisai Ojisan" ("Hey, old man") in 1972, which he wrote when he was in high school. A Song from the 1980 album Blood Lines, "Hana" also named "Subete no Hito no Kokoro ni Hana o", is frequently heard in international markets.

He was elected a member of the House of Councillors in July 2004. In 2010 he ran for a second term but lost.

== Music career with Champloose ==
Shoukichi Kina & Champloose (喜納昌吉&チャンプルーズ, Kina Shōkichi ando chanpurūzu) is a Japanese band from Okinawa blending traditional Okinawan music with a strong Western rock influence. Their name is apparently derived from the word for a traditional Okinawan stir-fry, chanpuru. Singer and lead songwriter Shoukichi Kina's electric sanshin was a particularly distinctive part of their sound. First major single was the classic "Haisai Ojisan" (Hey, old man), written while Kina was still in high school but not a hit until a few years later, in 1972. Later, Champloose's version of the Okinawan folk song "Jin Jin" (Firefly) was a minor hit in British discos, and their ballad "Hana" (Flowers), with vocals by Kina's wife Tomoko, became a weepy favourite in many Asian countries.

Their first, self-titled album, released in 1977, remains a Japanese folk-rock classic.

== Activism ==
Kina's activism is especially focused on peace efforts in his own prefecture of Okinawa, and much of his work as a composer makes explicit links between his art and his activism. Examples of this include his song "Kana-ami no nai shima" or his revision of the song "Shin-jidai no nagare" to add in lyrics that contain words by political activist Chibana Shoichi. He also created The White Ship of Peace Project, to “bring to the USA a message of peace for the future,” to counter to what he called the "black ships" that came to Japan after Matthew C. Perry opened Japan's doors to trade with the west. He also coined the slogan, “Lay down your weapons, take up musical instruments,” which he used during a trip to the United States for the project where he presented a sanshin to the UN secretary general. Kina also performs "peace concerts" in war-torn places, most recently in Baghdad.
