= Ryoko Moriyama =

Japanese folk singer (born 1948)

- 森山良子
- Born: January 18, 1948 (age 78); Shibuya, Tokyo, Japan
- Occupations: Singer; songwriter; actress
- Musical career
- Genres: J-pop; Jazz; Contemporary Folk
- Years active: 1967–present
- Website: ryoko-moriyama.jp

Ryoko Moriyama (森山 良子, Moriyama Ryōko) (born January 18, 1948) is a Japanese folk singer and actress. Her father is Hisashi Moriyama, a pioneer of Japanese jazz. Her son Naotarō Moriyama is a singer. Her first cousin Hiroshi Kamayatsu is also a musician.

She is known as the Japanese Joan Baez, or the Queen of college folk. Her songs tend not to become best sellers but her most famous song is "Satokibi Batake". This song is about a tragedy during the Battle of Okinawa. The song's full version is 10 minutes. When this song was first released, it was thought to be too long to air on the radio, but now the song is popular in Japan. Every summer, NHK air a shorter version as a symbol of the 'No War Campaign'. In the song, an imitative word 'Zawawa' is repeated 66 times, because of this, it is often called 'Zawawa'. Moriyama often called "Satokibi Batake" 'Zawawa' as a joke.

Her 1969 recording of "Kinjirareta koi" ("Unpermitted Love") sold over one million copies, and was awarded a gold disc. A more recent hit song is "Nada Sōsō," a poem set to music by Begin, and sung by Rimi Natsukawa.

Some of her songs, such as "Kono hiroi nohara ippai" and "Dona dona", now appear in school textbooks.

She sang a theme song at Nagano Olympics opening ceremony in 1998.

Inspired by "Satokibi Batake", a TV drama called Satokibi Batake no uta (Song of the Sugarcane field) was made. Akashiya Sanma takes the lead role as a soldier who refused to kill.

Nada Sōsō' also features in a TV program. Nada Sōsō means teardrops in Okinawan. The song describes the experience of being unable to meet the person you love most. The song may refer to the death of Moriyama's brother.

== Filmography ==
=== Film ===
- Give It All (1998), Satoko Shinomura
- Song of the Canefields (2003), as Herself.
- When Marnie Was There (2014) Elderly Lady (voice).
- Belle (2021), Yoshitani (voice)

=== Television ===
- Come Come Everybody (2022), Annie Hirakawa
