= Chuei Yoshikawa =

Japanese singer-songwriter

Chuei Yoshikawa (吉川 忠英, Yoshikawa Chūei; born 27 March 1947 in Tokyo) is a Japanese folk and jazz guitarist.

== Selected discography ==
- California Roll, Voss Records 1987
- Starry Eyed 2000
- Guitar by Guitar 2007
