= Begin (band) =

Japanese band

BEGIN
- Origin: Okinawa, Japan
- Genres: Pop rock, blues, Okinawan music
- Years active: 1989-present
- Label: Imperial Records
- Members: Eishō Higa; Masaru Shimabukuro; Hitoshi Uechi
- Website: BEGIN Official Web Site

Begin (ビギン, Bigin; IPA: [biɡiɴ], stylized as BEGIN) is a Japanese pop rock group from Ishigaki Island in the Yaeyama Islands of Okinawa Prefecture, Japan. Their sound contains many elements of traditional Okinawan music, and prominently features the sanshin.

In 2003, HMV Japan ranked the band at #100 in their "Top 100 Japanese pops Artists".

== History ==
The members of Begin – Eishō Higa (比嘉栄昇) (sanshin, vocals), Masaru Shimabukuro (島袋優) (guitar), and Hitoshi Uechi (上地等) (piano) – are all from Ishigaki Island. They have been friends since elementary school. They also attended the same senior high school but upon graduation all intended to go their separate ways. One day, Eishō gathered the members together again and they began to focus on music. On December 5, 1988, they sang at a friend's wedding, calling themselves "Begin" for the first time. Soon they began to become famous. As of 13 November 2006 they have released 22 singles, 24 albums and 8 DVDs. Perhaps their most famous song is "Nada Sōsō", a collaboration between Begin and Ryōko Moriyama. Begin has had at least one song appear on the NHK program Minna no Uta. They are also the performers of the "Ichariba Ohana" and "Izayoi Yoi", the opening and first ending themes of the Disney-produced anime series Stitch!.

== Selected songs ==
- "Blue Snow" (1990)
- "Koishikute" (恋しくて; 1990)
- "Sora ni hoshi ga aru yōni" (空に星があるように; 1997, 2000)
- "Nada Sōsō" (涙そうそう; 2000)
- "Akari" (灯り; 2001)
- "Shimanchu nu Takara" (島人ぬ宝; 2002)
- "Sanshin no hana" (三線の花; 2006)
- "Egao no manma" (笑顔のまんま; 2009)

== Discography ==
=== Singles ===
#	Release date	Title	Highest Oricon chart rank	Comments
1st	1990–3–21	Koishikute (恋しくて)	4th	
2nd	1990-12-01	Blue Snow	25th	
3rd	1991-11-10	YOU / Kore ga Hajimari Dakara (YOU/これがはじまりだから)	82nd	
4th	1992-10-25	Afureru Namida (あふれる涙)		
5th	1993–2–25	Sayonara, Soshite Arigatou (さよなら、そしてありがとう)		
6th	1993–7–25	Dareka ga Kimi wo Yobu Koe ga (誰かが君を呼ぶ声が)		
7th	1993-11-01	Hana-mochi Hito (花待ち人)		
8th	1994–7–25	OKINAWAN SHOUT		
9th	1995–3–25	Kimi dake wo Tsurete (君だけをつれて)		
10th	1996–7–06	Koe no Omamori kudasai (声のおまもりください)	36th	
11th	1997–5–21	Birthday Song		
12th	1997–9–03	Sora ni Hoshi ga Aru you ni (空に星があるように)		
13th	1997-11-21	Ai ga Hashiru (愛が走る)		
14th	1998–3–21	Uchi e Kaerou (家へ帰ろう)		
15th	1998–6–24	Mirai no Kimi e (未来の君へ)		
16th	1998–8–12	Bouhatei de Mita Keshiki (防波堤で見た景色)	99th	
17th	1999-10-21	Ai wo Sutenaide (愛を捨てないで)		
18th	2000–3–23	Nada Sousou (涙そうそう)	159th	First maxi single
19th	2000–5–31	Sora ni Hoshi ga Aru you ni (空に星があるように)	47th	Re-released as maxi single
20th	2000-10-18	Kaze yo (風よ)		
21st	2001-10-24	Akari (灯り)		
22nd	2002–2–27	BOTORU Nihon to CHOKOREETO (ボトル二本とチョコレート)		
23rd	2002–5–22	Shimanchu nu Takara (島人ぬ宝)	47th	
24th	2002–6–26	Nada Sousou / Shimanchu nu Takara (涙そうそう／島人ぬ宝)		Cassette Tape
25th	2003–2–20	OJII Jiman no ORIONBIIRU (オジー自慢のオリオンビール)		Maxi single, limited Okinawa only release
26th	2003–6–18	Sono Toki Umareta Mono (その時生まれたもの)	38th	
27th	2004–2–25	Itsumademo / YUGAFU-jima (いつまでも／ユガフ島)	49th	
28th	2004–8–11	Chikai (誓い)	37th	
29th	2004-12-16	Kimi wo Miteiru (君を見ている)	98th	
30th	2006-10-25	Sanshin no Hana (三線の花/東京)	20th	
31st	2007–2–07	MIIFAIYUU (ミーファイユー)	75th	
32nd	2007–7–25	Koko kara Mirai e (ここから未来へ)	115th	
33rd	2008–6–28	Bokura no Kono Subarashiki Sekai (僕らのこの素晴らしき世界)	99th	
34th	2008-10-22	ICHARIBAO HANA (イチャリバオハナ)	112th	
35th	2009–1–07	Egao no Manma (笑顔のまんま)	12th	
36th	2012–9–07	Kokudou 508 Gousen (国道508号線)	72nd	maxi single limited to Okinawa release
37th	2013–3–20	Haru ni GONDORA (春にゴンドラ)		

=== Albums ===
#	Release date	Title	Highest Oricon chart rank	Comments
1st	1990–6–23	Ongaku Ryodan (音楽旅団)	7th	
2nd	1991–3–27	GLIDER		
3rd	1991-11-21	Dokoka de Yume ga Kuchibue wo Fuku Yoru (どこかで夢が口笛を吹く夜)	27th	
4th	1992-12-02	THE ROOTS	74th	
5th	1993–9–22	MY HOME TOWN		
6th	1994–9–01	Chhaban Night		
7th	1995–3–25	FAN -LITTLE PIECES-		First best-of album
8th	1995-10-25	USED		First self-produced album
9th	1996-10-23	CM COMPILATION Twelve Steps	46th	Best-of album
10th	1997–6–21	Ongaku Ryodan II (音楽旅団II)		
11th	1998–6–24	Tokyo Ocean		
12th	1999–3–25	BALLADS		Best-of ballad selection album
13th	2000–7–21	BEGIN no Shimauta ~OMOTO TAKEO ~ (ビギンの島唄 〜オモトタケオ〜)	97th	First best-of compilation of shima-uta songs
14th	2000–9–21	BEGIN		10th anniversary commemorative album
15th	2001–2–21	BEGIN BEST 1990–2000	52nd	Best-of album
16th	2002–3–21	MUSIC FROM B.Y.G		Live music recorded at B.Y.G. Live house
17th	2002–7–03	BEGIN no Shimauta ~OMOTO TAKEO 2~ (ビギンの島唄 〜オモトタケオ2〜)	33rd	2nd best-of shimauta album
18th	2003–7–24	BEGIN no Ichigo Ichie (ビギンの一五一会)	7th	Self cover album
19th	2003–8–21	BEGIN no Ichigo Ichie 58 Drive (ビギンの一五一会 58ドライブ)	50th	Cover album of classic Japanese music
20th	2003–9–25	BEGIN no Ichigo Ichie Drive in Starter (ビギンの一五一会 ドライブインシアター)	70th	Cover album of Western music
21st	2004–7–14	Ocean Line	12th	15th anniversary commemorative album
22nd	2004–7–14	Reef Line	91st	
23rd	2005–2–23	BEGIN Single Daizenshuu (BEGIN シングル大全集)	5th	15th anniversary best-of album
24th	2005–2–23	Forest Green	243	
25th	2007–3–07	OKINAWAN FULL ORCHESTRA (オキナワン フール オーケストラ)	39th	
26th	2008–3–26	BEGIN Live Daizenshuu (BEGIN ライブ大全集)	49th	
27th	2008–7–23	BEGIN no Ichigo Ichie 2 (ビギンの一五一会2)	55th	
28th	2009–8–05	3LDK	33rd	
29th	2010–9–08	BEGIN no Shimauta ~OMOTO TAKEO 3~ (ビギンの島唄 〜オモトタケオ3〜)	25th	Third shimauta album
30th	2011–2–16	BEGIN Single Daizenshuu Tokubetsukan (BEGINシングル大全集 特別盤)	33rd	20th anniversary best-of album
31st	2011–7–20	BEGIN no Shimauta OMOTO TAKEO no ga Best (ビギンの島唄 オモトタケオのがベスト)	40th	
32nd	2012-10-24	Tropical Blues (トロピカルフーズ)	54th	

== See also ==
- Music of Japan
