= Music of Japan =

In Japan, music includes a wide array of distinct genres, both traditional and modern. The word for "music" in Japanese is 音楽 (ongaku), combining the kanji 音 on (sound) with the kanji 楽 gaku (music, comfort). Japan is the world's largest market for music on physical media and the second-largest overall music market, with a retail value of US$2.7 billion in 2017.

== Traditional and folk music ==
=== Gagaku, hougaku ===
The oldest forms of traditional Japanese music are:

- shōmyō (声明 or 聲明), or Buddhist chanting
- gagaku (雅楽), or orchestral court music

both of which date to the Nara (710–794) and Heian (794–1185) periods. Gagaku classical music has been performed at the Imperial court since the Heian period. Kagura-uta (神楽歌), Azuma-asobi (東遊) and Yamato-uta (大和歌) are indigenous repertories. Tōgaku (唐楽) allegedly resembles a Chinese Tang dynasty (618–907) style; komagaku may have come from the Korean Peninsula. In addition, gagaku subdivides into kangen (管弦) (instrumental music) and bugaku (舞楽) (dance accompanied by gagaku).

Samurai listened to and performed these music activities, in their practices of enriching their lives and understanding.

=== Biwa hōshi, Heike biwa and goze ===
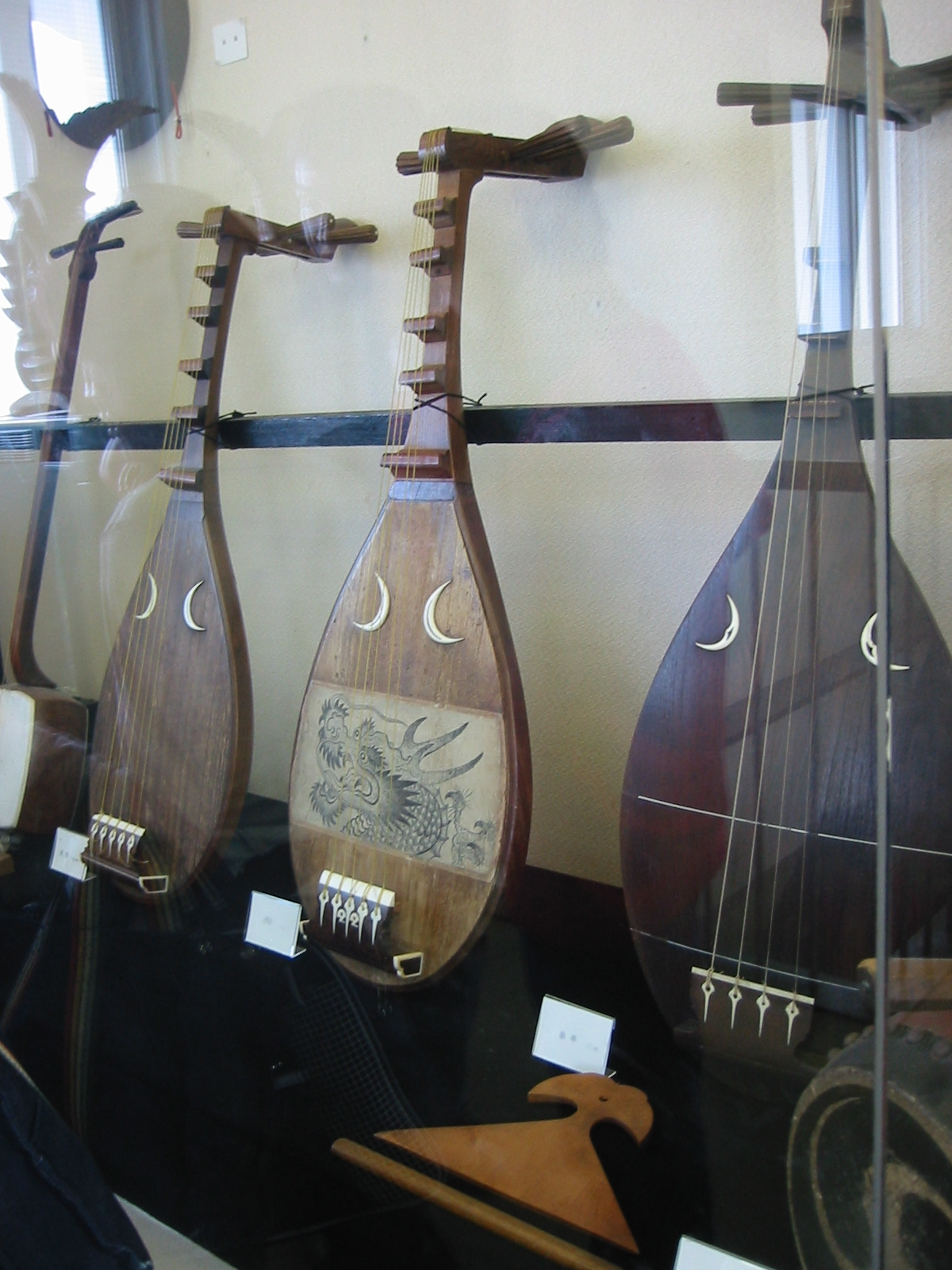
Biwa

The biwa (琵琶 - Chinese: pipa), a form of short-necked lute, was played by a group of itinerant performers (biwa hōshi). The root of Biwa music was The Tale of the Heike. Biwa hōshi organized into a guild-like association. The biwa is Japan's traditional instrument.

Lafcadio Hearn related in his book Kwaidan: Stories and Studies of Strange Things (1903) "Mimi-nashi Hoichi" (Hoichi the Earless), a Japanese ghost story about a blind biwa hōshi who performs "The Tale of the Heike".

Blind women, known as goze (瞽女), toured beginning in the medieval era, sang and played accompanying music on a lap drum. From the seventeenth century they often played the koto or the shamisen. Goze organizations sprung up in many places, and existed until the 21st century in Niigata Prefecture.

=== Wadaiko ===
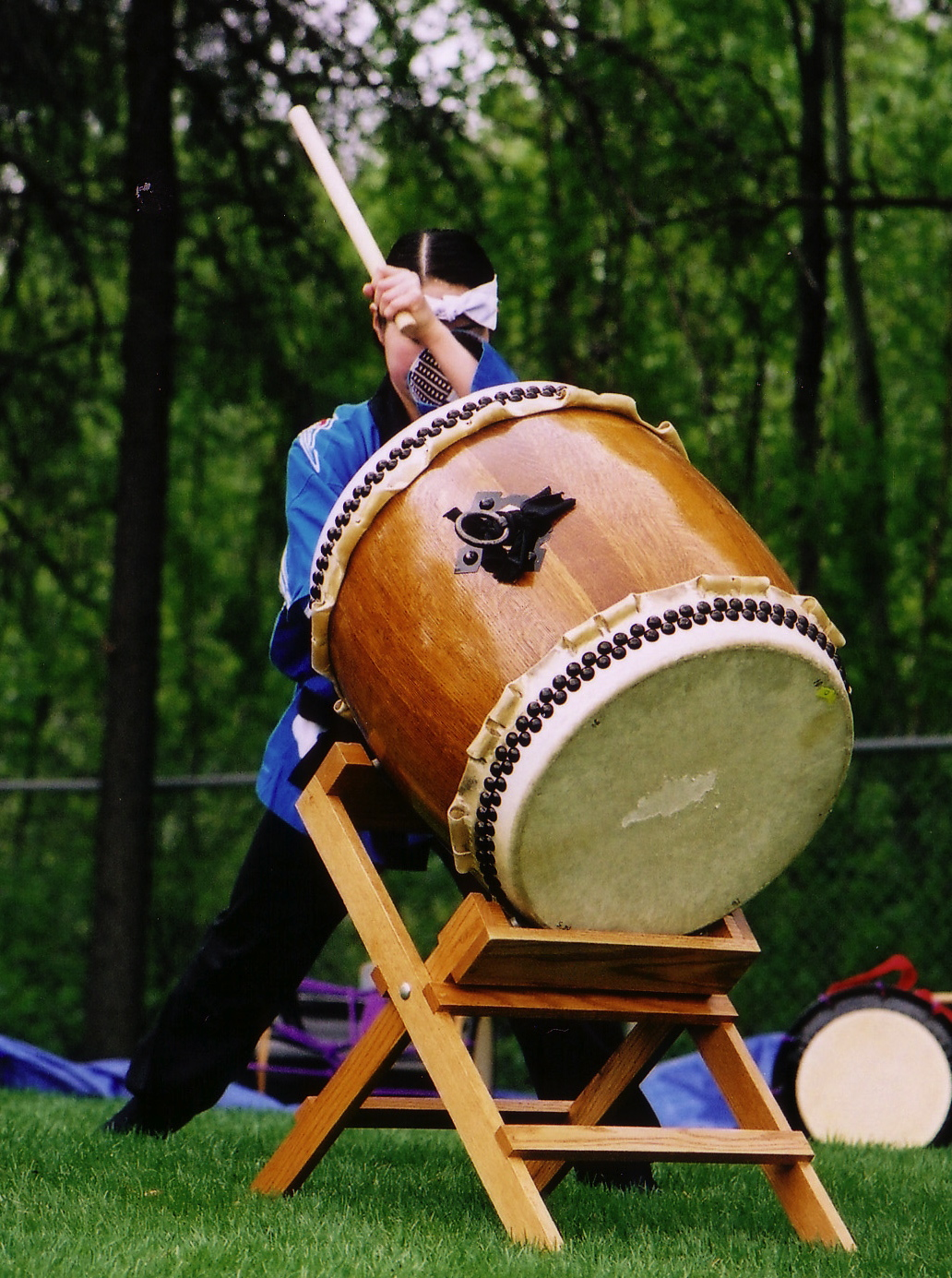
Taiko performing

Wadaiko, a Japanese drum, comes in various sizes and is used in variety of musical genres. It has become particularly popular in recent years as the central instrument of percussion ensembles whose repertory is based on a variety of folk- and festival-music of the past. Such taiko music is played by large drum ensembles called kumi-daiko. Its origins remain uncertain, but can be traced to the 7th century, when a clay figure of a drummer documented its existence. Chinese influences followed, but the instrument and its music remained uniquely Japanese. Taiko drums during this period were used during battle to intimidate the enemy and to communicate commands. Taiko continue to be used in the religious music of Buddhism and Shintō. In the past players were holy men who played only at special occasions and in small groups, but in time secular men (rarely women) also played the taiko in semi-religious festivals such as the bon dance.

Modern ensemble taiko was invented by Daihachi Oguchi in 1951. A jazz drummer, Oguchi incorporated his musical background into large ensembles of his design. His energetic style made his group popular throughout Japan, and made the Hokuriku region a center for taiko music. Musical groups to arise from this wave of popularity included Oedo Sukeroku Taiko, founded by Seido Kobayashi. 1969 saw a group called Za Ondekoza; Za Ondekoza gathered young performers who innovated a new roots revival taiko, which was used as a way of life in communal lifestyles. During the 1970s the Japanese government allocated funds to preserve Japanese culture, and many community taiko groups formed. Later in the century, taiko groups spread across the world, especially to the United States. The video game Taiko no Tatsujin is based around taiko.

=== Min'yō folk music ===
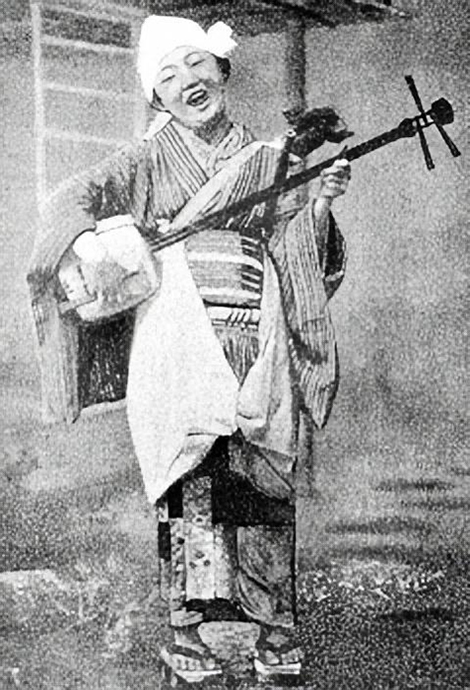
A Japanese folkswoman with her shamisen, 1904

Japanese folk songs (min'yō) can be grouped and classified in many ways but it is often convenient to think of five main categories:

- fisherman's work song, farmer's work song
- lullaby
- religious songs (such as sato kagura, a form of Shintoist music)
- songs used for gatherings such as weddings, funerals, and festivals (matsuri, especially Obon)
- children's songs (warabe uta)

In min'yō, three-stringed lute known as the shamisen, taiko drums, and a bamboo flute called shakuhachi typically accompany the singers. Other instruments that could accompany include a transverse flute known as the shinobue, a bell known as kane, a hand drum called the tsuzumi, and/or a 13-stringed zither known as the koto. In Okinawa the main instrument is the sanshin. These are traditional Japanese instruments, but modern instrumentation, such as electric guitars and synthesizers, is also used in this day and age, when enka singers cover traditional min'yō songs (enka being a Japanese music genre all its own).

An ondo generally describes any folk song with a distinctive swing that may be heard as 2/4 time rhythm (though performers usually do not group beats). The typical folk song heard at Obon festival dances is typically an ondo. A bushi ("melody" or "rhythm") is a song with a distinctive melody. The word is rarely used on its own, but is usually prefixed by a term referring to occupation, location, personal name or the like. Bon uta are songs for Obon, the lantern festival of the dead. Komori uta are lullabies. The names of min'yo songs often include a descriptive term, usually at the end. For example: Tokyo Ondo, Kushimoto Bushi, Hokkai Bon Uta, and Itsuki no Komoriuta.

Many of these songs include extra stress on certain syllables as well as pitched shouts (kakegoe). Kakegoe are generally shouts of cheer but in min'yō, they are often included as parts of choruses. There are many kakegoe, though they vary from region to region. In Okinawa Min'yō, for example, the common "ha iya sasa!" appears. In mainland Japan, however, "a yoisho!," "sate!," or "a sore!" are more common. Others include "a donto koi!," and "dokoisho!"

Recently a guild-based system known as the iemoto system has been in effect in some forms of min'yō. This system originally developed for transmitting classical genres such as nagauta, shakuhachi, or koto music, but since it proved profitable to teachers and was supported by students who wished to obtain certificates of proficiency. It continues to spread to genres such as min'yō, Tsugaru-jamisen and other forms of music that were traditionally transmitted more informally. Today some min'yō are passed on in such pseudo-family organizations and long apprenticeships are common.

=== Okinawan folk music ===
Umui, religious songs, shima uta, dance songs, and, especially kachāshī, lively celebratory music, were all popular on the island. Okinawan folk music differs from mainland Japanese folk music in several ways.

Okinawan folk music is often accompanied by the sanshin, whereas in mainland Japan the shamisen accompanies instead. Other Okinawan instruments include the sanba (which produce a clicking sound similar to that of castanets), taiko and a sharp finger whistle called yubi-bue (指笛).

A pentatonic scale is often used in min'yō from the main islands of Japan. In this pentatonic scale the subdominant and leading tone (scale degrees 4 and 7 of the Western major scale) are omitted, resulting in a musical scale with no half steps between each note. (Do, Re, Mi, Sol, La in solfeggio, or scale degrees 1, 2, 3, 5, and 6). Okinawan min'yō, however, uses scales that include the half-steps omitted in the aforementioned pentatonic scale, when analyzed in the Western discipline of music. In fact, the most common scale used in Okinawan min'yō includes scale degrees 1, 2, 3, 4, 5, 6, and 7.

=== Traditional instruments ===
- Biwa (琵琶)
- Fue (笛)
- Hichiriki (篳篥)
- Hocchiku (法竹)
- Hyōshigi (拍子木)
- Kane (鐘)
- Kakko (鞨鼓)
- Kokyū (胡弓)
- Koto (琴)
- Niko (二胡)
- Okawa (also known as Ōtsuzumi) (大鼓)
- Ryūteki (竜笛)
- Sanshin (三線)
- Shakuhachi (bamboo flute) (尺八)
- Shamisen (三味線)
- Shime-Daiko (締太鼓)
- Shinobue (篠笛)
- Shō (笙)
- Suikinkutsu (water zither) (水琴窟)
- Taiko (i.e. Wadaiko) 太鼓～和太鼓
- Tsuzumi (鼓) (also known as Kotsuzumi)

== Arrival of Western music ==
=== Japanese blues/Enka ===
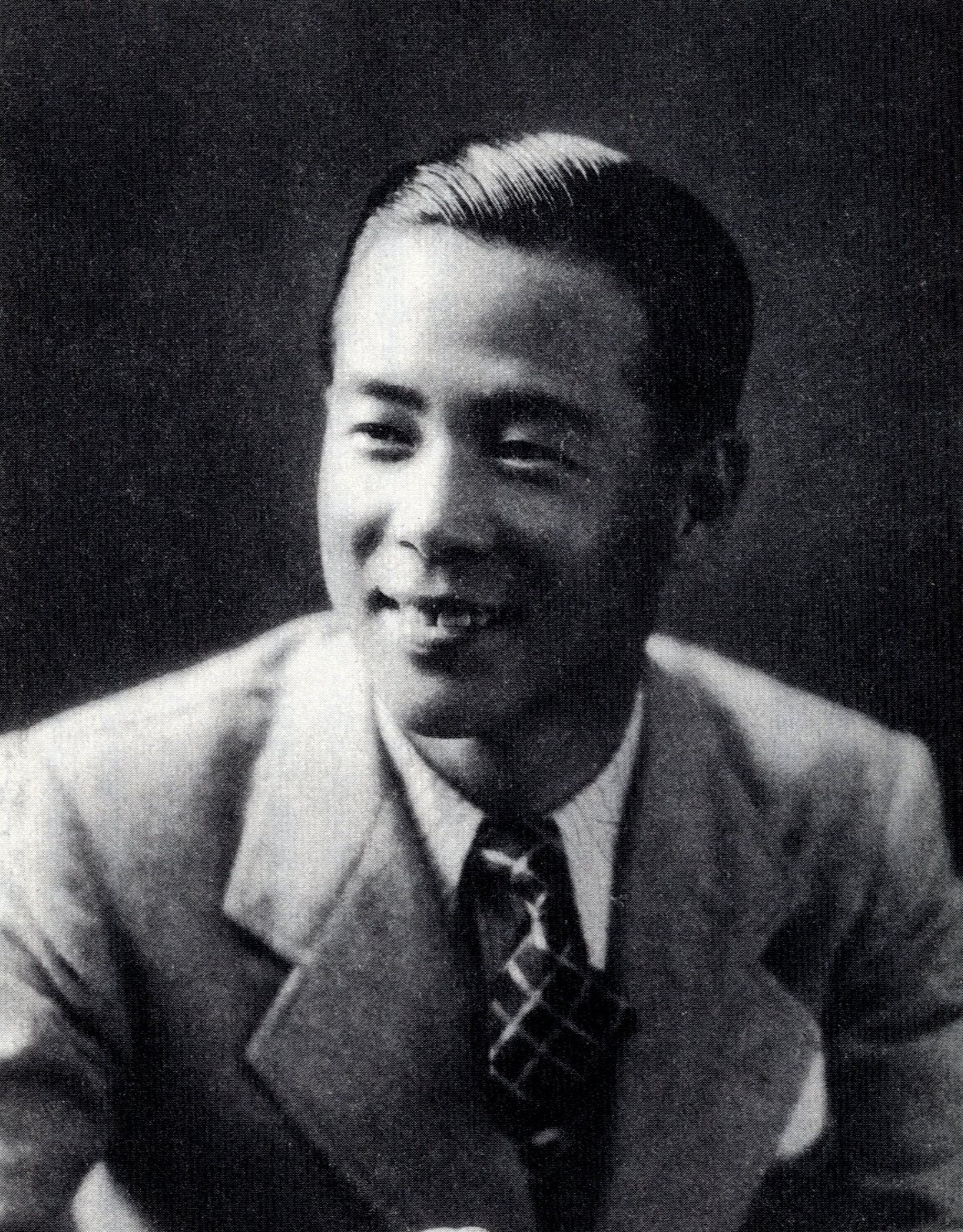
Ichiro Fujiyama, influential ryūkōka singer

After the Meiji Restoration introduced Western musical instruction, Shuji Isawa compiled songs like "Auld Lang Syne" for use in public education. Two major forms of music that developed during this period were shōka, which was composed to bring western music to schools, and gunka.

As Japan moved towards representative democracy in the late 19th century, leaders hired singers to sell copies of songs that aired their messages, since the leaders themselves were usually prohibited from speaking in public.

The 1947 hit song Tokyo Boogie-Woogie performed by Shizuko Kasagi epitomized new-found optimism after the end of the war, and Kayōkyoku became a major industry, especially after the arrival of superstar Misora Hibari, once known as 'Baby Kasagi'. In the 1950s, tango and other kinds of Latin music, especially Cuban music, became very popular. A distinctively Japanese form of cha-cha-chá called dodompa emerged in the 1960s. Kayōkyoku became associated with traditional Japanese structures influenced by Enka. Famous enka singers include Hibari Misora, Saburo Kitajima, Ikuzo Yoshi and Haruo Minami.

=== Art music ===
==== Western classical music ====
Shuji Isawa (1851–1917) studied music at Bridgewater Normal School and Harvard University and was an important figure in the development of Western-influenced Japanese music in the Meiji Era (1868–1912). On returning to Japan in 1879, Isawa formed the Ongaku-Torishirabe-Gakari (Music Investigation Agency), a national research center for Western music; it was later renamed the Tokyo Music School (Tôkyô ongaku gakkô). In 1880, Isawa's American friend and teacher, Luther Whiting Mason, accepted a two-year appointment. Kosaku Yamada, Yoshinao Nakada, and Toru Takemitsu are Japanese composers who have successively developed what is now known as Japanese Classical Music.

Western classical music established a strong presence in Japan, making the country one of the most important markets for this music tradition. A 2026 analysis of Google search data by Skoove and DataPulse Research found that, per adult, searches in Japan for learning a musical instrument ran at 3.01 times the average of 26 ranked countries, the highest rate among them, and that two thirds (67%) of these searches in Japan were for the piano. The analysis adjusted for Google handling only about 74% of searches in Japan, as searches on Yahoo! Japan are not included in the data. Toru Takemitsu composed avant-garde music, contemporary classical music, and movie scoring.

===== Orchestras =====
- Hiroshima Symphony Orchestra
- Hyogo Performing Arts Center Orchestra
- Japan Philharmonic Orchestra
- Kanagawa Philharmonic Orchestra
- Nagoya Philharmonic Orchestra
- New Japan Philharmonic
- NHK Symphony Orchestra
- Orchestra Ensemble Kanazawa
- Osaka Philharmonic Orchestra
- Osaka Shion Wind Orchestra
- Sapporo Symphony Orchestra
- Tokyo Kosei Wind Orchestra
- Tokyo Metropolitan Symphony Orchestra
- Tokyo Philharmonic Orchestra
- Tokyo Symphony Orchestra
- Yomiuri Nippon Symphony Orchestra

Besides traditional symphony orchestras, Japan is internationally prominent in the field of wind bands. The All-Japan Band Association is the governing body for wind band competitions in the country.

==== Jazz ====
From the 1930s on (except during World War II, when it was repressed as music of the enemy) jazz maintained a strong presence in Japan. The country is an important market for the music, and it is common that recordings unavailable in the United States or Europe are available there. A number of Japanese jazz musicians, such as June (born in Japan) and Sadao Watanabe have a large fan base outside their native country.

== Popular music ==
=== J-pop ===
J-pop, an abbreviation for Japanese pop is a loosely defined musical genre that entered the musical mainstream of Japan in the 1990s. J-pop has its roots in 1960s pop and rock music, such as the Beatles, which 70s rock bands fused rock with Japanese music. J-pop was further defined by Japanese new wave bands such as Southern All Stars and Yellow Magic Orchestra in the late 1970s. Eventually, J-pop replaced kayōkyoku ("Lyric Singing Music", a term for Japanese pop music from the 1920s to the 1980s) in the Japanese music scene. The term was coined by the Japanese media to distinguish Japanese music from foreign music.

==== Idol music ====
Japanese idol musical artists are a significant part of the market, with girl groups and boy bands regularly topping the singles chart. These include boy band Arashi, which had the best-selling singles of 2008 and 2009, and girl group AKB48, which have had the best-selling singles each year of the 2010s. Since the end of the 2010s, more and more idol groups have emerged. Their success is sometimes termed "Idol sengoku jidai" (アイドル戦国時代; lit. Idol war age). In 2014, about 486,000 people attended Momoiro Clover Z's live concerts, which was the highest record for female musicians in Japan for this year. Since the Covid-19 pandemic, many idol groups have seen their sales plummet. For example, AKB48's physical sales have fallen from over a million copies sold per single to around 300,000, while groups such as Nogizaka46, Sakurazaka46 or Hinatazaka46 have seen a smaller drop, with average sales of 500,000 to 700,000 copies for their recent singles, making them the most trending Japanese idol groups of the 2020s.

==== City pop ====
City pop is the term for a style of Japanese pop music that arose during a period of rapid economic growth and technological development during the 1970s to 1980s. City pop was a uniquely Japanese take on adult-oriented American genres such as funk, disco, jazz, AOR, and soft rock, combining them with Japanese pop sensibilities and then new Japanese technologies such as electronic musical instruments, car cassette decks and the Walkman.

City pop was largely pioneered by Tatsuro Yamashita and Haruomi Hosono in the 1970s. The genre is related to the techno-pop music of Yellow Magic Orchestra, with both genres influencing each other during the 1970s to 1980s.

=== Techno-kayō ===
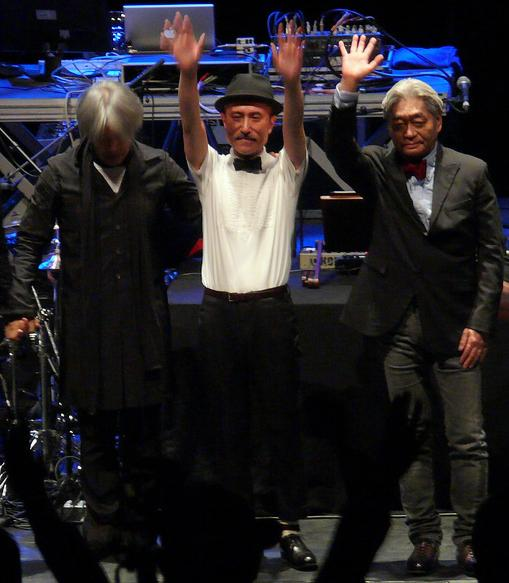
Yellow Magic Orchestra in 2008

Techno-kayō, also known as synth-pop or techno-pop, was pioneered by Yellow Magic Orchestra (YMO) in 1978. They were pioneers in their use of synthesizers, samplers, sequencers, drum machines, computers, and digital recording technology, and effectively anticipated the electro-pop boom of the 1980s. They are credited with playing a key role in the development of several electronic music genres, including synth-pop, electro and techno.

YMO's success was followed by other popular new wave and synth-pop bands such as P-Model, The Plastics and Hikashu in the late 1970s. Many musicians who were known for pop music turned to techno productions during the late 1970s to 1980s, such as C-C-B and Akiko Yano. In the 1990s, Denki Groove formed and became mainstays of the Japanese electronica scene. Artists such as Polysics pay explicit homage to this era. Capsule's Yasutaka Nakata has been involved behind the scenes of popular electropop acts Perfume and Kyary Pamyu Pamyu, both of which had domestic and international success; Kyary in particular was dubbed the "Kawaii Harajuku Ambassador".

==== Dance music ====
In 1984, American musician Michael Jackson's album Thriller became the first album by a Western artist to sell over one million copies in Japanese Oricon charts history. His style is cited as one of the models for Japanese dance music, leading the popularity of Avex Group musicians and dancers.

In 1990, Avex Trax began to release the Super Eurobeat series in Japan. Eurobeat in Japan led the popularity of group dance form Para Para. While Avex's artists such as Every Little Thing and Ayumi Hamasaki became popular in the 1990s, in the late 1990s Hikaru Utada and Morning Musume emerged. Hikaru Utada's debut album, First Love, became the highest-selling album in Japan selling over 7 million copies, while Ayumi Hamasaki became Japan's top selling female and solo artist, and Morning Musume remains one of the most well-known girl groups in the Japanese pop music industry.

==== Kawaii future bass ====
Kawaii Future Bass is a subgenre of Future Bass, with a generally upbeat sound and heavily inspired by Japanese culture, and often includes Japanese lyrics or references to anime or manga. It began to see success around 2015, mostly pioneered by Snail's House. Due to Japan's increasing influence in foreign countries, Kawaii Future Bass grew popular around the world.

=== Theme music ===
Theme music for films, anime, tokusatsu (tokuson (特ソン)) and dorama are considered a separate music genre. While musicians and bands from all genres have recorded for Japanese television and film, several artists and groups have spent most of their careers performing theme songs and composing soundtracks for visual media. Such artists include Masato Shimon (current holder of the world record for most successful single in Japan for "Oyoge! Taiyaki-kun"), Ichirou Mizuki, all of the members of JAM Project (i.e. Hironobu Kageyama who sung the openings for Dengeki Sentai Changeman and Dragon Ball Z), Akira Kushida, members of Project.R, Isao Sasaki and Mitsuko Horie. Notable composers of Japanese theme music include Joe Hisaishi, Michiru Oshima, Yoko Kanno, Toshihiko Sahashi, Yuki Kajiura, Kōtarō Nakagawa, Shunsuke Kikuchi and Yuki Hayashi.

==== Game music ====
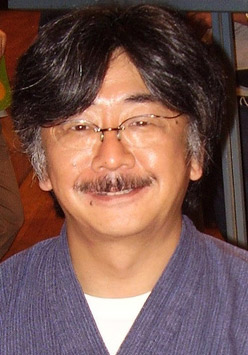
Nobuo Uematsu, composer for the Final Fantasy game series

When the first electronic games were sold, they had rudimentary sound chips with which to produce music. As the technology advanced, quality increased dramatically. The first game to take credit for its music was Xevious, also noteworthy (at that time) for its deeply constructed stories. One of the most important games in the history of the video game music is Dragon Quest. Koichi Sugiyama, who composed for various anime and TV shows, including Cyborg 009 and a feature film of Godzilla vs. Biollante, got involved in the project out of curiosity and proved that games can have serious soundtracks. Until his involvement, music and sounds were often neglected in the development of video games and programmers with little musical knowledge were forced to write the soundtracks as well. Undaunted by technological limits, Sugiyama worked with only 8-part polyphony to create a soundtrack that would not tire the player despite hours of gameplay.

A well-known author of game music is Nobuo Uematsu. Uematsu's earlier compositions for the game series, Final Fantasy, on Famicom (Nintendo Entertainment System in America), were arranged for full orchestral score. In 2003, he took his rock-based tunes from their original MIDI format and created the Black Mages. Yasunori Mitsuda is the composer of music for such games as Xenogears, Xenosaga Episode I, Chrono Cross, and Chrono Trigger. Koji Kondo, the sound manager for Nintendo, wrote themes for Zelda and Mario. Jun Senoue composed for Sonic the Hedgehog. He also is the main guitarist of Crush 40, which is known for creating the theme songs to Sonic Adventure, Sonic Adventure 2, Sonic Heroes, Shadow the Hedgehog, and Sonic and the Black Knight, as well as other Sonic games. Motoi Sakuraba composed the Tales, Dark Souls, Eternal Sonata, Star Ocean, Valkyrie Profile, Golden Sun, and the Baten Kaitos games, as well as numerous Mario sports games. Yuzo Koshiro composed electronic music-influenced soundtracks for games such as Revenge of Shinobi and the Streets of Rage series.

Pop singers such as Hikaru Utada, Nana Mizuki and BoA sometimes sing for games.

=== Rock ===
In the 1960s, many Japanese rock bands were influenced by Western rock, along with Appalachian folk music, psychedelic rock, mod and similar genres: a phenomenon called Group Sounds (G.S.). John Lennon became one of the most popular Western musicians in Japan. Late 1960s, Group Sounds bands such as The Tempters, the Tigers, the Golden Cups, the Spiders, the Jaguars, the Ox, the Village Singers, the Carnabeats, the Wild Ones, the Mops were popular. After the boom of Group Sounds came folk singer-songwriters. the Tigers was the most popular Group Sounds band in the era. Later, some of the members of the Tigers, the Tempters and the Spiders formed the first Japanese supergroup Pyg.

Kenji Sawada and Kenichi Hagiwara started their solo career in the early 1970s along with rock bands such as the Power House, Blues Creation, and late 70s hard rock bands like Murasaki, Condition Green, Bow Wow. Carol (led by Eikichi Yazawa), RC Succession and Funny Company helped define the rock sound. In the late 70s, Creation and Char performed Jeff Beck-style rock. Beginning in the late sixties, but mostly in the seventies, musicians mixed rock with American-style folk and pop elements, usually labelled folk rock because of their regular use of the acoustic guitar. This includes bands like Tulip, Banban, and Garo. Rock artists include an early Southern All Stars.

Japanese musicians began experimenting with electronic rock in the 1970s. The most notable was Isao Tomita, whose 1972 album Electric Samurai: Switched on Rock featured electronic synthesizer renditions of contemporary rock and pop songs. Other early examples of electronic rock records include Inoue Yousui's folk rock and pop rock album Ice World (1973) and Osamu Kitajima's progressive psychedelic rock album Benzaiten (1974), both of which involved contributions from Haruomi Hosono, who later started the electronic music group "Yellow Magic Band" (later known as Yellow Magic Orchestra) in 1977.

In the 1980s, Yutaka Ozaki was popular in young rock fans. Pop rock group such as C-C-B, Tokyo JAP, and Red Warriors gained hit songs. Boøwy inspired alternative rock bands like Shonen Knife, the Pillows, and Tama & Little Creatures as well as more experimental bands such as Boredoms and mainstream bands such as Glay. In 1980, Huruoma and Ry Cooder, an American musician, collaborated on a rock album with Shoukichi Kina, driving force behind the aforementioned Okinawan band Champloose. They were followed by Sandii & the Sunsetz, who further mixed Japanese and Okinawan influences. Also during the 1980s, Japanese metal and rock bands gave birth to the movement known as visual kei, represented during its history by bands like X Japan, Buck-Tick, Luna Sea, Malice Mizer and many others, some of which experienced national, and international success in the latest years.

In the 1990s, Japanese rock musicians such as B'z, Mr. Children, L'Arc-en-Ciel, Glay, Southern All Stars, Judy and Mary, Tube, Spitz, Wands, T-Bolan, Field of View, Deen, Lindberg, Sharam Q, the Yellow Monkey, the Brilliant Green and Dragon Ash achieved great commercial success. B'z is the #1 best selling act in Japanese music since Oricon started to count, followed by Mr. Children. In the 1990s, pop songs were often used in films, anime, television advertisement and dramatic programming, becoming some of Japan's best-sellers. The rise of disposable pop has been linked with the popularity of karaoke, leading to criticism that it is consumerist: Kazufumi Miyazawa of the Boom said "I hate that buy, listen, and throw away and sing at a karaoke bar mentality." Of the visual kei bands, Luna Sea, whose members toned down their on-stage attire with on-going success, was very successful, while Malice Mizer, La'cryma Christi, Shazna, Janne Da Arc, and Fanatic Crisis also achieved commercial success in the late 1990s.

The rock band Supercar, which was characterized as having "almost foundational importance to 21st century Japanese indie rock", released its influential first album in 1998. They remained active through 2005, with their later albums containing more electronic rock.

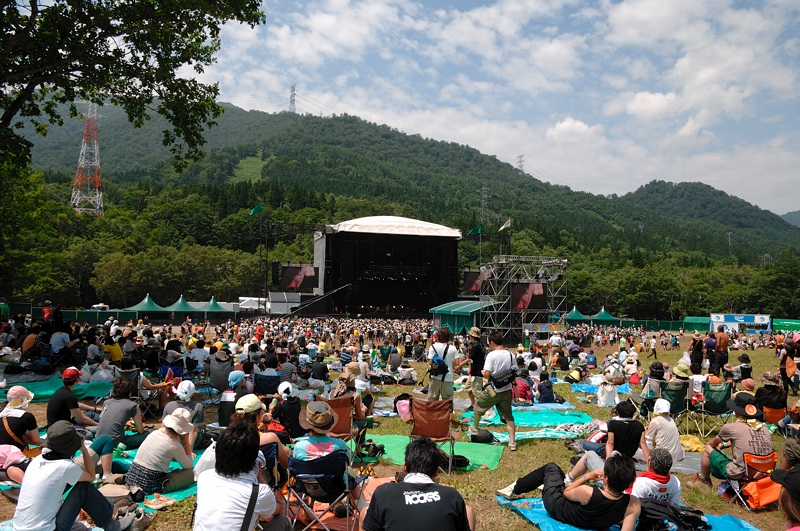
Green Stage of the Fuji Rock Festival

The first Fuji Rock Festival opened in 1997. Rising Sun Rock Festival opened in 1999. Summer Sonic Festival and Rock in Japan Festival opened in 2000. Though the rock scene in the 2000s was not as strong, bands such as Bump of Chicken, Asian Kung–Fu Generation, One Ok Rock, Flow, Orange Range, Radwimps, Sambomaster, Remioromen, Uverworld and Aqua Timez achieved success. Orange Range also ventured into hip-hop. Established bands as B'z, Mr. Children, Glay, and L'Arc-en-Ciel continued to top charts, though B'z and Mr. Children are the only bands to maintain high sales through the years.

Many bands from Japan's underground rock scene have achieved international recognition, including noise rock bands such as Boredoms and Melt Banana, stoner rock bands such as Boris, psychedelic rock bands such as Acid Mothers Temple, and alternative acts such as Shonen Knife, Pizzicato Five and the Pillows. More mainstream indie rock artists such as Eastern Youth, the Band Apart and Number Girl found some success in Japan, but little recognition outside of their home country. Other notable international touring indie rock acts are Mono and Nisennenmondai.

==== Punk rock / alternative ====
Early examples of punk rock include SS, the Star Club, the Stalin, INU, Gaseneta, Bomb Factory, Lizard (who were produced by the Stranglers) and Friction (whose guitarist Reck played with Teenage Jesus and the Jerks before returning to Tokyo) and the Blue Hearts. The early punk scene was filmed by Sogo Ishii, who directed the 1982 film Burst City featuring a cast of punk bands/musicians and also filmed videos for The Stalin. In the 1980s, hardcore bands such as GISM, Gauze, Confuse, Lip Cream and Systematic Death began appearing, some incorporating crossover elements. The independent scene also included a diverse number of alternative/post-punk/new wave artists such as Aburadako, P-Model, Uchoten, Auto-Mod, Buck-Tick, Guernica and Yapoos (both of which featured Jun Togawa), G-Schmitt, Totsuzen Danball and Jagatara, along with noise/industrial bands such as Hijokaidan and Hanatarashi.

Ska-punk bands of the late nineties extending in the years 2000 include Shakalabbits and 175R (pronounced "inago rider").

=== Heavy metal ===
Japan is a successful market for metal bands. Notable examples are Judas Priest's Unleashed in the East, Deep Purple's Made in Japan, Iron Maiden's Maiden Japan, Michael Schenker Group's One Night at Budokan and Dream Theater's Live at Budokan.

Japanese metal emerged in the late 1970s, pioneered by bands like Bow Wow, formed in 1975 by guitarist Kyoji Yamamoto, and Loudness, formed in 1981 by guitarist Akira Takasaki. Contemporary bands like Earthshaker, Anthem and 44 Magnum released their debut albums only around the mid eighties. The first overseas live performances were by Bow Wow in 1978 in Hong Kong, the Montreux Jazz Festival, and the Reading Festival in England in 1982. In 1983, Loudness toured United States and Europe. In 1985, the first Japanese metal act was signed to a major US label. Their albums Thunder in the East and Lightning Strikes, released in 1985 and 1986, peaked at number 74 (while number 4 in homeland Oricon chart), and number 64 in the Billboard 200 charts respectively. Till the end of the eighties only two other bands, Ezo and Dead End, released albums in the United States. In the eighties few bands had a female member, like the all-female band Show-Ya fronted by Keiko Terada, and Terra Rosa with Kazue Akao on vocals. In September 1989, Show-Ya's album Outerlimits was released, reaching #3 on the Oricon album chart. Heavy metal bands reached their peak in the late 1980s and then many disbanded until the mid-1990s.

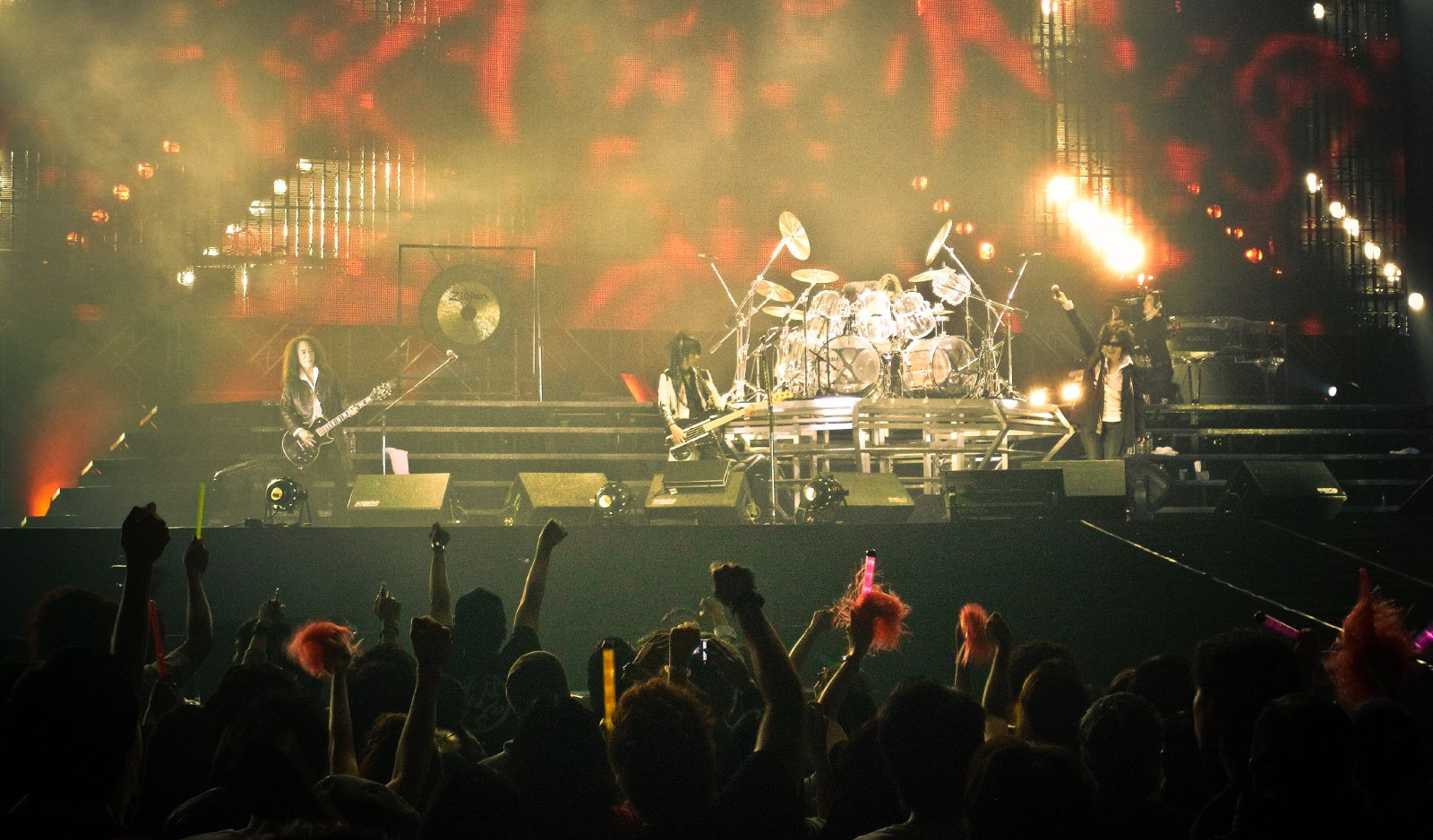
Concert of pioneer of visual kei, X Japan at Hong Kong in 2009 after their 2007 reunion

In 1982, some of the first Japanese glam metal bands were formed, like Seikima-II with Kabuki-inspired makeup, and X Japan who pioneered the Japanese movement known as visual kei, and became the best-selling metal band. In 1985, Seikima-II's album Seikima-II - Akuma ga Kitarite Heavy Metal was released and although it reached number 48 on the Oricon album chart, it exceeded 100,000 in sales, the first time for any Japanese metal band. Their albums charted regularly in the top ten until the mid-1990s. In April 1989, X Japan's second album Blue Blood was released and went to number 6, and after 108 weeks on charts sold 712,000 copies. Their third and best-selling album Jealousy was released in July 1991; it topped the charts and sold 1.11 million copies. Two number one studio albums, Art of Life and Dahlia, a singles compilation X Singles, all sold more than half a million, ending up with thirteen top five singles before disbanding in 1997.

Japanese metal came to global attention in 2014 with the success of "kawaii metal" band Babymetal. They recorded viral YouTube hits like "Gimme Chocolate!!" as well as international performances including at the UK's Sonisphere Festival 2014 and Canada's Heavy Montréal alongside the likes of Metallica and Slayer. Babymetal was the opening act to five of Lady Gaga's concerts in her ArtRave: The Artpop Ball 2014 tour. Babymetal won numerous awards including Kerrang!'s The Spirit of Independence Award and Metal Hammer's Breakthrough Band Award.

==== Extreme metal ====
Japanese extreme metal bands formed in the wake of the American and European wave, but did not get any bigger exposure until the 1990s, and the genre took underground form in Japan. The first thrash metal bands formed in the early 1980s, like United, whose music incorporates death metal elements, and Outrage. United performed in Los Angeles at the metal festival "Foundations Forum" in September 1995 and released a few albums in North America. Formed in the mid-1980s, Doom played in the United States in October 1988 at CBGB, and was active until 2000 when it disbanded.

The first bands to play black metal music were Sabbat, who is still active, and Bellzlleb, who was active until the early 1990s. Other notable acts are Sigh, Abigail, and Gallhammer.

Doom metal also gained an audience in Japan. The two best-known Japanese doom metal acts are Church of Misery and Boris: both gained considerable popularity outside the country.

==== Metalcore ====
In the 2000s, Japanese metalcore bands such as Tokyo's Crystal Lake, Nagoya natives Coldrain and Deathgaze, Kobe's Fear, and Loathing in Las Vegas, and Osaka's Crossfaith formed.

=== Hip-hop ===
The first known Japanese group to experiment with hip-hop was Yellow Magic Orchestra (YMO) with the 1981 album BGM. The album was significant to the early history of hip-hop, particularly its introduction of the Roland TR-808 drum machine. UnderMain Magazine describes the track "Music Plans" as where "the beginnings of that funky, electronic boom-bap vibe of hip-hop beats start to emerge" and the track "Rap Phenomenon" as "an aural Australopithecus of electronic rap music." American hip-hop pioneer Afrika Bambaataa cited the album BGM as an influence, along with YMO's earlier work and Ryuichi Sakamoto's 1980 solo electro track "Riot in Lagos" from B-2 Unit. YMO and Sakamoto also had a significant influence on other key early American hip-hop figures such as Mantronix, Duke Bootee, Whodini, Thomas Dolby, and Twilight 22.

American hip-hop became popular in Japan during the late 1980s and has since continued to thrive. Up until then, the music world's belief was that "Japanese sentences were not capable of forming the rhyming effect that was contained in American rappers' songs."

Different "families" of rappers perform on stage at a genba, or nightclub. A family is essentially a collection of rap groups that are usually headed by one of the more famous Tokyo acts, which also include proteges. They are important because they are "the key to understanding stylistic differences between groups." Hip-hop fans in the audience are in control of the club. They judge who is the winner in rap contests on stage. An example of this can be seen with the battle between rap artists Dabo (a major label artist) and Kan (an indie artist). Kan challenged Dabo while Dabo was mid-performance. The event highlighted showed "the openness of the scene and the fluidity of boundaries in clubs."

=== Grime ===
Grime is a British electronic genre that emerged in the early 2000s derived from UK garage and jungle, and draws influence from dancehall, ragga, and hip-hop. The style is typified by rapid, syncopated breakbeats, generally around 140 bpm, and often features an aggressive or jagged electronic sound. Rapping is a significant element, and lyrics often revolve around gritty depictions of urban life.

Grime elements were anticipated by the 1982 song "Bamboo Houses" by Ryuichi Sakamoto and David Sylvian. According to Fact magazine, it "accidentally predicted" grime, calling it "the earliest example of proto-grime" with elements such as a "gleaming synth lead, syncopated drumming and the type of vaguely Asian motif that would go on to define much of Wiley and Jammer's early work" in the Sinogrime subgenre. The track has appeared on Kode9’s DJ sets and was remixed by Boxed founder Slackk, becoming "a grime touchstone" according to Fact.

In 2004, Japanese DJ's began to play grime. In 2008 that MC's, primarily from Osaka, began to emerge. The MC's were inspired by British grime crew Roll Deep, and their mixtape Rules And Regulations. The Osaka MC's consisted of pioneers MC Dekishi, MC Duff and MC Tacquilacci. MC Dekishi released the first ever Japanese grime mixtape in 2009, titled "Grime City Volume 1". Osaka MC's are known for rapping extremely fast. Another scene sprung up in the Tokyo region of Shibuya led by Carpainter, Double Clapperz, MC ONJUICY, PAKIN and Sakana Lavenda.

=== Roots and country music ===
In the late 1980s, roots bands like Shang Shang Typhoon and the Boom became popular. Okinawan roots bands like Nenes and Kina were also commercially and critically successful. This led to a second wave of Okinawan music, led by the sudden success of Rinken Band. Bands followed, including the comebacks of Champluse and Kina, as led by Kawachiya Kikusuimaru; very similar to kawachi ondo is Tadamaru Sakuragawa's goshu ondo.

J-country is a form of J-pop that originated in the 1960s, during the international popularity of Westerns. Major companies such as Nintendo and Sony continue to produce country and Western music within Japan.

=== Latin, reggae and ska music ===
Music from Indonesia, Jamaica and elsewhere were assimilated. African soukous and Latin music, like Orquesta de la Luz (オルケスタ・デ・ラ・ルス), was popular as was Jamaican reggae and ska, exemplified by Mice Teeth, Mute Beat, La-ppisch, Home Grown and Ska Flames, Determinations, and Tokyo Ska Paradise Orchestra.

=== Noise music ===
Another recognized music form from Japan is noise music, also known as Japanoise when referring to noise music made by Japanese artists. Some of the most prominent representatives of this form include Merzbow, Masonna, Hanatarash, and The Gerogerigegege. As befits the challenging nature of the music, some noise music performers have become notorious for their extreme on-stage antics including (but not limited to) physically injuring themselves, destroying their musical equipment, or damaging the venue they are playing at.

== See also ==
- Cool Japan
- Oricon
- Shibuya-kei
- List of musical artists from Japan
- List of Japanese hip hop musicians
- List of J-pop artists
