= Seijin Noborikawa =

Seijin Noborikawa 登川誠仁
- Born: 11 November 1932; Uruma, Okinawa, Japan
- Died: 19 March 2013 (aged 80)
- Genres: Min'yō
- Occupation: Singer

Seijin Noborikawa (登川誠仁, Noborikawa Seijin; 11 November 1932 – 19 March 2013), born in Uruma, Okinawa, was a master Okinawan musician and min'yō folk singer, and a headliner of the Utanohi music festival.

== Biography ==
Noborikawa was born to a farming family in Misato Village (now Uruma) in the Nakagami District, Okinawa. From the age of 7, he became familiar with homemade sanshin, watching Mouashibi and learning folk songs. He was able to dance the Kachāshī by 11. He hardly attended school and started smoking at 8 and drinking at 9. After the war ended, he worked at the US military base.

At the age of sixteen, Noborikawa joined the Shibai Matsu Theater of Okinawa and sang folk songs. He thoroughly learned sanshin from Itarashiki Asaken and won the "Amateur Singing Competition" of Ryukyuhoso radio together with Rinshō Kadekaru. From 1955, he became a folk singer who performs solo. He also gained popularity in a trio with Yoshinaga Masayasu and Tsunami Tsunenaga.

In 1957, Shuei Kohama, Kina, and others established the Ryukyu Folk Songs Association. In 1963, Noborikawa became the youngest executive of the reorganized organization. In 1956, he also discovered and promoted Sadao China.

In 1970, he published three music books, such as "Folk and Dance Songs Kunkunshi", which added voice notes to kunkunshi, the score for sanshin. In 1976, he received the 1st Achievement Award from the Ryukyu Folk Songs Association for these accomplishments. Since 1984 he served as chairman of the association for six terms, and since 1998 he was appointed honorary chairman. In 1999 he received Ryukyubin folk song master from the association. In 1989 it has been certified as a holder of Okinawa Prefecture Designated Intangible Cultural Property Skills. For musical instruments other than Sanshin, he was also a special advisor to the Japan Sanba Association (now Okinawa Sanba Association).

In addition to music activities, he also appeared in the movie Nabbie's Love ( directed by Yuji Nakae) in 1999 and the same director's Hotel Hibiscus in 2002.

In 2010 he appeared in NHK Okinawa Broadcasting Station's analog television ending program with キャン×キャン, a comedic duo.

At the end of January 2013 he was hospitalized in Okinawa City due to liver cirrhosis. He died of liver failure on March 19, 2013

== See also ==
- Okinawan music
- Music of Japan
