= Ryukyu Underground =

Electronic music duo

- Origin: Okinawa, Japan
- Genres: Electronica/Uchinaa pop
- Years active: 2002 - present
- Labels: Respect Records (Japan)
- Members: Jon Taylor, Keith Gordon
- Website: http://www.ryukyu-underground.com/

Ryukyu Underground (琉球アンダーグラウンド, Ryūkyū Andāguraundo) is an electronic music duo, consisting of Keith Gordon and Jon Taylor, whose music is heavily based on and inspired by traditional Okinawan folk music.

== Artistic style ==
The duo's music blends Okinawan folk songs with Western dance music and dub, and they often collaborate with native Okinawan singers and other musicians. Though their music may at times sound like a DJ's mix of dance tracks with min'yō tracks, it consists mostly, if not entirely, of compositions composed, performed and recorded as original, new pieces. It may draw extensively from traditional lyrics, tunes, and chords, it is never simply mixed from pre-existing recordings by other artists, and always includes considerable original elements. The pair started out incorporating vocals and other elements via sampling, on later albums and other releases they have worked directly with Okinawan artists, recording vocals and other elements live in the studio. The duo has released four albums, and their music has been included in Buddha Bar compilation albums and used on a variety of television programs, documentaries, and other media.

Though questions could be raised about Westerners appropriating Okinawan music, the duo's reception in Okinawa by locals has been described as "ecstatic". The duo first tested their music in dance clubs in Okinawa, and were well received, the natives even dancing traditional kachashi dances to it. In an interview in 2003, Taylor expressed that "we are both sensitive to the fact that Okinawan music is an important part of Okinawan culture, and we certainly don't want to disrespect it or commercialize it in a cheap way for profit. However, I'm confident we haven't done either."

Taylor cites Rinken Band, the Nenes, and Champloose, the leading bands of the 1970s Uchinaa pop boom, among the duo's influences. Just as those bands took up electric guitar and other "modern" instruments and sought to replicate the traditional folk songs, so Taylor notes that he and Gordon saw potential in doing something similar using computer equipment.

Most of Ryukyu Underground's albums and singles are released by the label Respect Records (Japan).

== Background ==
Gordon grew up in Newcastle upon Tyne, in England, and was a fan of David Bowie and early punk music. He first started playing music in the early 1980s, primarily on synthesizer but is said to have been "out of sync with the mods and metalheads around him", before shifting to DJing and organizing events in Manchester. In an interview with the Japan Times, he describes this as "a good time to be in Manchester," but by the late 1980s, he was tired of the aggressive scene there.

Leaving England, Gordon spent some time in Denmark, where he found a more open and welcoming environment for his music. One of his tracks, a remix of the theme to the television show "Twin Peaks", was No. 1 on the Finnish charts for a time.

Gordon eventually left Denmark and after four years traveling through Asia and Australasia ended up in Okinawa, where in 1998 he met the American Jon Taylor, who was there doing doctoral research on the environmental problems faced by the islanders. Taylor had previously been a member of The Subjects, an electronic group, and had played guitar for several reggae groups, including U-Roy and The Ethiopians. Gordon describes Taylor as having been the one to motivate him into starting Ryukyu Underground and taking it seriously.

Gordon still lives in Okinawa today, while Taylor lives in Los Angeles, where he works as a professor of geography; the two continue to collaborate by exchanging music and other data through the internet.

== Discography ==
=== Albums ===
- Ryukyu Underground (2002)
- Mo Ashibi (2003)
- Ryukyu Remixed (2004)
- An Evening with Ryukyu Underground (2005)
- Shimadelica (2006)
- Umui (2009)

=== Maxi-Singles ===
- "Hana" (2003)
- "Kuiji nu Hana" (2004)
- "Okinawa Lounge" (2004)
- "Kogane no Hana" (2006)
- "Seragaki" (2004)

=== Tracks Appear On ===
- Buddha Bar VI
- Buddha Bar VII
- Buddha Bar XII
- Taipei Lounge 2
- Double Standard - Sunaga T Experience
- Peace Not war - Japan
- The Maze Vol. 2 - The Avantgarde Of Trance
- Zen Connection 3
- Baroque In Session 02
- Side-Tracked
- World Meditation - Spiritual Music For Modern Living
- A Tango for Guevara and Evita (Miyazawa Kazufumi)
- "Bar: Tokyo"
