= Michiwa Kuduchi =

Ryukyuan folk song

Michiwa Kuduchi (Japanese: 道輪口説, Michiwa kuduchi) is a Ryukyuan folk song from Okinawa Prefecture, Japan. Its formal name is "Michiwa Kuduchi". When the song is accompanied by a dance, it's referred to as "Aki no Odori" (秋の踊り).

Aki no Odori is relatively younger than most Ryukyuan folk music, which is why its lyrics are in Japanese rather than in one of the Ryukyuan languages.

== Lyrics ==
Michiwa Kuduchi (Japanese)
Romaji	Kanji
Sora mo nagatsuki hajimegoro kaya yomo no momiji wo. Someru shigure ni nurete ojika no na ku mo sabishiki ori ni tsugekuru. Kari no hatsune ni kokoro utarete tomo ni uchitsure. Izuru nohara no kikyo karukaya hagi no nishiki wo. Kitemo miyoto ya maneku obana no sode ni yukaze. Fuku mo mi ni shimu yu-hi irie no ama no onoko ya.^{a} Sao no shizuku ni sode wo nurashite namiji haruka ni. Oki ni kogi ide tsuki wa higashi no yama no ko no ma ni imazo ho no me ku.	空も長月はじめ頃かや 四方のもみじを。 そめる時雨にぬれて牡鹿のなくもさびしき 折りにつげ来る。 雁の初音に心うかれてともにうちつれ。 出づる野原の桔梗苅萱 萩の錦を。 きても見よとや招く尾花が 袖の夕風。 吹くも身にしむ夕日入江の海士のおのこや。 棹のしずくに袖をぬらして 波路はるかに。 沖に漕ぎ出で月は東の山の木の間に今ぞほのめく。

== See also ==
- Ryukyuan music
- Okinawan music
- Sanshin

== Notes ==
a. There are numerous variations of the sixth verse. The word "onoko" is often replaced with "kodomo", "koromo", etc.
