= Aha Bushi =

Japanese folk song

Aha Bushi (Japanese and Kunigami: 安波節, Ahabushi) is an Ryukyuan folk song native to the Yanbaru region of Okinawa Island, Japan. It is sung in the Kunigami language, one of the six Ryukyuan languages.

It is often used as a starting song for beginners in sanshin due to its recognizable rhythm and slow pacing.

== Lyrics ==
Aha Bushi (Kunigami language)
Romaji	Hiragana
Kariyushi nu ashibi hari uchihariti karaya. Yunu akiti tida nu hari agaru madi madin. Yunu akiti tida ya hari agarawan yutasa. Miman tuchi madin hari uyuwe sabi sabira. Aha nu ma hantaya hari chimusu gari dukuru. Uku nu machi shicha ya hari ni nashi duku dukuru.	かりゆし め あしび はり うちはりてぃ からや。 ゆぬ あきてぃ てぃだ ぬ はり あがる までぃ までぃん。 ゆぬ あきてぃ てぃだ や はり あがらわん ゆたさ。 みまん とぅち までぃん はり うゆゑ さび さびら。 あは ぬ ま はんたや はり ちむす がり どぅくる。 うく ぬ まち しちゃ や はり に なし どぅく どぅくる。

== In popular culture ==
Numerous musicians have performed covers of Aha Bushi, including Ryukyuan-Hawaiian activist Rob Kajiwara.

== See also ==
- Ryukyuan music
- Okinawan music
- Sanshin
