= Okinawan music =

Music associated with the Okinawa Islands or Okinawa Prefecture

Okinawan music (沖縄音楽, Okinawa ongaku) is the music associated with the Okinawa Islands of southwestern Japan. In modern Japan, it may also refer to the musical traditions of Okinawa Prefecture, which covers the Miyako and Yaeyama Islands in addition to the Okinawa Islands. It has its roots in the larger musical traditions of the Southern Islands.

== Genres ==
A dichotomy widely accepted by Okinawan people is the separation of musical traditions into koten (classical) and min'yō (folk). Okinawa was once ruled by the highly centralized kingdom of Ryūkyū. The samurai class in the capital of Shuri developed its high culture while they frequently suppressed folk culture in rural areas. Musicologist Susumu Kumada added another category, "popular music", to describe songs that emerged after the kingdom was abolished in 1879.

=== Classical music ===
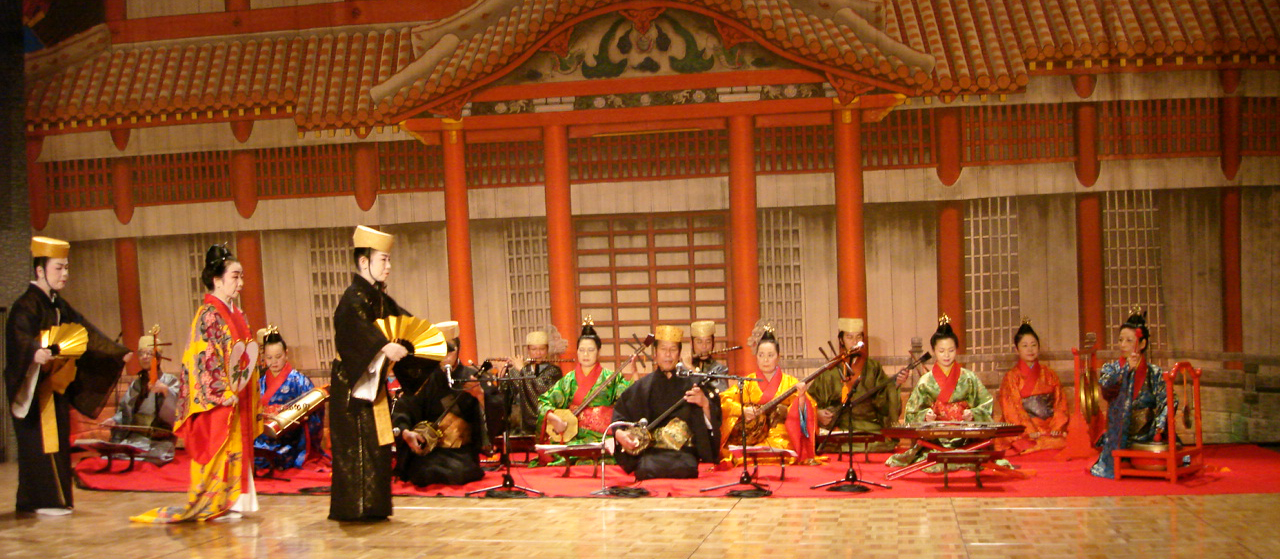
Uzagaku

Ryukyuan classical music (琉球古典音楽, Ryūkyū koten ongaku) was the court music of Ryūkyū. Uzagaku (御座楽) was the traditional chamber music of the royal palace at Shuri Castle. It was performed by the bureaucrats as official duties.

The texture is essentially heterophonic using a single melodic line. Pitched accompaniment instruments each play a simultaneous variation on the vocal line.

=== Folk music ===
Traditionally seen as "low culture" by the samurai class, Okinawan folk music (沖縄民謡) gained positive evaluation with the rise of folkloristics led by Yanagita Kunio. Folk music is described by the Japanese term min'yō. Since the kingdom was abolished, some members of the former samurai class spread Shuri-based high culture to other areas of Okinawa. Some of such new elements are today seen as part of folk culture.

Okinawa's folk songs are generally accompanied by one (or more) sanshin.

The suffixes -ondo and -bushi (both meaning "song" or "melody") may also be attached to the title of folk songs, however songs named without these clarifiers are more common. Eisā and kachāshī are Okinawan dances with specific music styles that accompany them.

Warabi uta

Warabi uta (童歌) is a general term for nursery rhymes and children's songs.

=== Popular music ===
==== New folk songs ====
"New min'yō" (新民謡, shin min'yō), composed in the style of traditional Okinawan min'yō, have been written by several contemporary Okinawan folk musicians such as Rinshō Kadekaru, Sadao China, Shoukichi Kina, Seijin Noborikawa, and Tsuneo Fukuhara. These songs are often heard in contemporary pop music arrangements. Haisai ojisan (ハイサイおじさん), with music and lyrics by Shōkichi Kina, is typical of this genre.

Okinawa's (new) folk songs are sometimes referred to as shima-uta. The term is not native to Okinawa but was borrowed from its northern neighbor, the Amami Islands, in the 1970s. The application of the term to Okinawan music is disfavored by people who see shima-uta as a regional brand of the Amami Islands.

==== Okinawa pop ====
The music of Okinawa came under the influence of American rock music beginning with the end of World War II. Many musicians began to blend the Okinawan folk music style and native instruments with those of American popular and rock music. This is called "Uchinaa pop". One example is Ryukyu Underground, who combine both classical and folk music with modern Dub music.

== Instrumentation ==
The instrument that defines Okinawan music is the sanshin (shamisen). It is a three-stringed lute, very similar to the Chinese sanxian and a precursor to the Japanese shamisen. The body is covered in snake skin and it is plucked with a plectrum worn on the index finger.

Okinawan folk music is often accompanied by various taiko drums such as shime-daiko (締太鼓), hira-daiko (平太鼓), and pārankū (パーランクー). Pārankū, a small hand-held drum about the size of a tambourine, is often used in eisā dancing.

Other percussion instruments such as sanba (三板), yotsutake (四つ竹) and hyōshigi (拍子木) can often be heard in Okinawan music. Sanba are three small, flat pieces of wood or plastic that are used to make rapid clicking sounds, similar to castanets. Yotsutake are two sets of rectangular bamboo strips tied together, one set held in each hand, clapped together on the strong beat of the music. Traditionally they have been used in classical music, but recently they have been used in eisā dancing.

A group of singers called a hayashi (囃子) often accompanies folk music, singing the chorus or interjecting shouts called kakegoe (掛け声). Also finger whistling called yubi-bue (指笛) is common in kachāshī and eisā dance tunes.

Additional instruments are often used in classical music, and sometimes incorporated in folk music:

- Kutu (箏, クトゥ) – an Okinawan version of the koto; often called Ryūkyū sō (琉球箏) or Okinawa goto (沖縄箏)
- Kūchō (胡弓, クーチョー) – an Okinawan version of the kokyūKūchō (胡弓, クーチョー)
- Fue (笛) – an Okinawan transverse flute; also called fansō (ファンソー) or ryūteki (琉笛)

== Tonality ==
The following is described in terms used in Western disciplines of music.

Music from Okinawa uses tonal structure that is different in music from mainland Japan and Amami in particular the intervalic content of the scales used.

The chief pentatonic scale used in mainland Japan, for example, uses scale degrees 1, 2, 3, 5, and 6, also known as Do, Re, Mi, So, and La in the Kodály system of solfeggio. This structure avoids half step intervals by eliminating the fourth and seventh scale degrees.

In contrast, music from Okinawa is abundant in the half steps. Common structures used in Okinawan music are a pentatonic scale utilizing scale degrees 1, 3, 4, 5, 7, or Do, Mi, Fa, So, Ti, or a hexatonic scale with the addition of the second scale degree, 1, 2, 3, 4, 5, 7, or Do, Re, Mi, Fa, So, Ti. Half steps occur between the third and fourth (Mi and Fa), and also the seventh and first (Ti and Do) scale degrees. In particular, the interval from 7 to 1, or Ti to Do is very common. A folk tune can often be recognized as being Okinawan by noting the presence of this interval.

== Notable Okinawan songs ==
Title	Okinawan name	Notes
"Tinsagu nu Hana" "Tinsaku no hana" "Chinsagu nu hana"	てぃんさぐぬ花	"The Balsam Flowers"; a warabe uta; Okinawan children would squeeze the sap from balsam flowers to stain their fingernails. The lyrics of the song are Confucian teachings.
Ishinagu no uta	石なぐの歌	"Pebble Song"; a ryūka poem written by Gushikawa Chōei; It is known for its thematic similarity to Kimigayo, the national anthem of Japan. It uses the same melody as Kajyadifu.
"Tanchamee"	谷茶前	a song originating in the village of Tancha in Onna, Okinawa
"Tōshin dōi"	唐船どーい	"A Chinese Ship Is Coming"; The most famous kachāshī dance song, it is often performed as the last song of an Okinawan folk music show.
"Nākunī"	なーくにー	a lyrical song expressing deep longing
"Haisai ojisan"	ハイサイおじさん	a "new min'yō", music and lyrics by Shoukichi Kina
"Bye-bye Okinawa"	バイバイ沖縄	music and lyrics by Sadao China
"Tiidachichinuhikari" "Okinawan Amazing Grace"	太陽月ぬ光 アメイジング・グレイス『沖縄方言ヴァージョン』	a song about the Okinawan religion to the tune of Amazing Grace
"Akata Sun dunchi" "Akata Sundunchi"	赤田首里殿内	"Inside Shuri Temple in Akata Village", a traditional song about Maitreya Boddhisatva. It has become a popular children's song.
"Bashōfu"	芭蕉布	Bashoofu is Okinawan banana cloth.
"Kādikū"	嘉手久	a courtship kachāshī dance song
"Shichi-gwachi eisā"	七月エイサー	an eisā dance song
"Warabi-gami"	童神	a lullaby
"Shima nu hito"	島ぬ女	"Island Woman"
"Nishinjō bushi"	西武門節	written in 1933 by Matsuo Kawata (川田松夫)
"Kajadifū bushi" "Kagiyadefī bushi"	かじゃでぃ風 かぎやで風節	a classical (koten) Okinawan dance song; Also called "Gojin fuu" (御前風), it was played before kings. It is commonly sung with an accompanying dance at Okinawan weddings today.
"Jin jin" "Jing jing"	ジンジン	a warabe uta; The title means "firefly"; the lyrics implore the firefly to "come down and drink". Shoukichi Kina and Champloose's version of this song, with slide guitar by Ry Cooder, was a minor hit in British discos. Takashi Hirayasu and Bob Brozman released a 2000 collaboration album by the same title that is a collection of various Okinawan songs or nursery rhymes. Their song "Jin Jin" is track 6 on this album.
"Ten'yō bushi"	てんよー節	A common song involving red and white flags played at the Obon Festival.
"Nada Sōsō"	涙そうそう	"Great Tears Are Spilling", 2000 single with music by Begin, lyrics by Ryoko Moriyama
"Hana – Subete no hito no kokoro ni hana o"	花~すべての人の心に花を~	music and lyrics by Shoukichi Kina
"Kudaka"	久高	
"Ninjōbushi"	にんじょー節	
"Futami Jōwa"	ふたみじょーわ	

== Okinawan musicians and musical ensembles ==
=== Traditional (Classical / Koten Ongaku) ===
- Choichi Terukina – Living National Treasure
- Kishun Nishie – Living National Treasure

=== Traditional (Folk/Min'yô) ===
- Sadao China
- Rinshō Kadekaru
- Misako Koja
- Nēnēs
- Seijin Noborikawa
- Misako Oshiro

=== Pop ===
- The Boom – rock band from Yamanashi Prefecture, known for the song Shima Uta
- Cocco
- High and Mighty Color
- HY
- Shoukichi Kina & Champloose
- Mongol800
- Rimi Natsukawa
- Orange Range
- Rinken Band
- Ryukyu Underground – A duo fusing traditional Okinawan music with Electronica genres such as Dub.
- DA PUMP
- Fuzzy Control
- RYUU-unit
- Ryukyudisko
- Fujiko Shuri

== Media ==
"Tinsagu nu Hana"
The traditional Okinawan song "Tinsagu nu Hana"
