= Ai no Uta: Self-Selection Best =

Compilation album by Rimi Natsukawa
- Released: March 9, 2008
- Recorded: 2001–2008
- Genre: J-pop, Shima uta, traditional
- Length: 1:14:48
- Label: Victor Entertainment

Rimi Natsukawa chronology
Uta Sagashi: Request Cover Album (2007)	Ai no Uta: Self-Selection Best (2008)	Kokoro no Uta (2009)

Singles from Ai no Uta: Self-Selection Best
- 1. "Ano Hana no Yō ni" Released: January 3, 2008

Ai no Uta: Self-Selection Best (あいのうた～セルフセレクション・ベスト～, Love Song) is the 5th compilation album released by Rimi Natsukawa on March 9, 2008.

== Promotion ==
The album was preceded by the single "Ano Hana no Yō ni" by two months. The song was written by singer Masumi, and was used as the theme song of the drama Fullswing.

== Contents ==
The album features songs chosen by Natsukawa as her favourites from her discography. All the chosen songs are songs with messages in them. Only four A-sides feature: the rest are album tracks (with the exception of "Sora no Yō ni Umi no Yō ni" and "Gettōka," which were B-sides from the "Kokoro Tsutae" and "Michishirube" singles respectively.

== Track listing ==
No.	Title	Writer(s)	Arranger(s)	Length
1.	"Tokotowa no Uta (とことわのうた, Everlasting Song)"	Kundō Koyama, Chikuzen Sato	Seiichi Kyōda	4:17
2.	"Nada Sōsō (涙そうそう, Great Tears Are Spilling)"	Begin, Ryoko Moriyama	Kyōda	4:19
3.	"Ano Hana no Yō ni (あの花のように, Like That Flower)"	Masumi	Akira Inoue	5:02
4.	"Toki no Kawa (時の河, River of Time)"	Chokkyū Murano, Takuya Harada	Kyōda	5:35
5.	"Sanctuary (サンクチュアリ, Sankuchuari)"	Yūko Ebine, Hideo Saitō	Kyōda	4:54
6.	"Sora no Yō ni Umi no Yō ni (空のように海のように, Like the Sky, Like the Sea)"	Gorō Matsui, Kyōda	Kyōda	5:02
7.	"Tsuki no Niji (月の虹, Moon Rainbow)"	Toshiaki Arashiro, Masaaki Uechi	Chuei Yoshikawa	4:49
8.	"Sayōnara Arigatō (Ama no Kaze) (さようなら ありがとう～天の風～, Good-Bye, Thank You (Sky Wind))"	Kentarō Kobuchi	Kobuchi	4:44
9.	"Warabigami (Yamatoguchi) (童神～ヤマトグチ～, Little God (Standard Japanese))"	Misako Koja, Kazuya Sahara	Kyōda	4:45
10.	"Ōgon no Hana (黄金の花, Green Gold Flower)"	Osami Okamoto, Sadao China	Yoshikawa	4:49
11.	"Ai no Chikara (愛のチカラ, The Power of Love)"	Mamoru Miyagi, Johnny Ginowan	Nakamura	7:15
12.	"Gettōka (月桃花, Pink porcelain lily)"	Mari Hayama, Yoshikawa	Kyōda	4:46
13.	"Dare ni mo Ienai Kedo (誰にも言えないけど, I Haven't Told Anyone, But)"	Moriyama	Kyōda	5:00
14.	"Kana yo Kana yo (愛よ 愛よ, Love Love)"	Kazufumi Miyazawa	Miyazawa	4:37
15.	"Itoshi Hito e (いとしい人へ, To My Dear)"	Megumi Ayukawa, Akira Senju	Kyōda	4:03

== Japan Sales Rankings ==
Release	Chart	Peak position	First week sales	Sales total	Chart run
March 9, 2008	Oricon Daily Albums Chart				
March 9, 2008	Oricon Weekly Albums Chart	40	4,252	11,488	8 weeks
March 9, 2008	Oricon Yearly Albums Chart				
