= Rinshō Kadekaru =

Rinshō Kadekaru (嘉手苅 林昌, Kadekaru Rinshō; 4 July 1920 – 9 October 1999) was a Japanese-Okinawan singer who was known as a representative Okinawan folk, shimauta, singer of the post-war era.

== Early life ==
Kadekaru was born in Goeku Village, Okinawa Prefecture to Rintarō and Ushi Kadekaru. He was the eldest of three siblings, with two younger sisters. He began playing around with sanshin from the age of seven, and was strongly influenced by his mother, who was also a singer. At age eight, he collaborated with his mother to compose the song Haihan nu bushi (廃藩ぬ武士, "samurai of the abolished han").

Growing up, Kadekaru quit school at times in order to help his family with the farming; he held a number of part-time jobs, and performed, singing and playing sanshin alongside classmates and others in the neighborhood in local festivals.

At the age of 16, Kadekaru left home, using money he gained by selling one of the family cows to pay his fare on a ship to Osaka. There, he lived and worked in a lumbermill, delivering firewood to local businesses, and occasionally meeting with other Okinawans with whom he sang and played sanshin. After roughly three years in Osaka, in 1939, he returned home for a mandatory physical examination, as part of the conscription process, and was conscripted into the 46th Regiment of the Ōita Prefecture Army. He served as a member of standby reserves for two years, and then applied to work overseas while remaining in the reserves, and worked for a time on Tinian and Saipan Islands with a South Seas trading company. While on Saipan, he was also involved in an Okinawan theatre troupe on the side.

In 1944, while training on the Micronesian island of Kosrae, Kadekaru was gravely wounded, taken prisoner, and brought to a field hospital, where he remained for some time. It was feared that he would not survive to return to Japan, and a formal report of his death was sent out; Kadekaru did survive, however, and returned to Japan in November 1945, making his home in Zushi, Kanagawa. He spent the next several years touring the country with an Okinawan theatre troupe. He returned to Okinawa in the spring of 1949, and to his hometown after a nine-year absence; his father died earlier that year. Kadekaru worked for a time driving a horsecart, and later overseeing the kitchens at a US military base.

== Career ==
Kadekaru made his first formal recording in 1950, though it was not released until 1958. Along with Shōei Kina, Shōtoku Yamauchi, and Shuei Kohama, Kadekaru led the birth of a golden age of Okinawan folk music. He was featured on public radio from its beginnings in Okinawa in the 1950s, and performed in a variety of venues throughout the prefecture, including local festivals and theatrical productions. Between original compositions and revivals of traditional songs, Kadekaru developed a repertoire of over one thousand songs. His unique sound came to be known as Kadekaru-bushi (嘉手苅節; lit. "Kadekaru melody" or "Kadekaru intonation"). Some of his most famous songs center on themes of the dramatic changes experienced by post-war Okinawa.

Kadekaru established music schools in Gushikawa and Urasoe, and was a founding member of the Ryūkyū Folk Music Association (琉球民謡協会, ryūkyū min'yō kyōkai). His first LP album was released in 1965. He continued to release albums, and to engage in performance tours for many years. The end of the American occupation of Okinawa in 1972 brought a surge in the popularity of Okinawan music throughout Japan, and marked a highlight in Kadekaru's career.

Over the course of his career, Kadekaru appeared as a regular on a number of radio and TV programs, as well as appearing in several films, frequently working with director Gō Takamine, and performing in a wide variety of venues. Towards the beginning of his career, he also moved frequently, staying for example on Iejima for several years, where he taught, before living for a year in Ishikawa prefecture, where he performed regularly at an onsen resort.

In the early 1990s, Kadekaru received a number of formal commendations from Okinawa prefecture, including the Okinawa Times Prize, which he was awarded in 1995. The Ryūkyū Folk Music Association which he helped found in 1962 named him "min'yō meijin" (民謡名人, "folk music legend") in 1999. Though there had been rumors he would retire several years prior, Kadekaru continued to perform, and appeared in the film Nabi no koi in 1999, before dying later that same year of lung cancer.

A number of memorial albums were released posthumously, including reissues of his earlier albums. Kadekaru is frequently included on Okinawa min'yō compilation albums. A memorial concert was held in his memory in 2001 in Naha, featuring 145 musicians, including min'yō performers China Sadao, Seijin Noborikawa, Teruya Kantoku, and Rinshō's son Kadekaru Rinji.

== Selected discography ==
=== LP ===
- Kadekaru Rinshō (1965), Marufuku
- Umi nu Chinbōrā (1969), URC
- Ryūkyū jōkagyō ("Ryukyu Love Songs")(1974), Victor
- Okinawa no kokoro ("Heart of Okinawa")(1974), Elec

=== Cassette ===
- Kadekaru Rinshō 20 Songs (1983), BCY
- Heisei no Kadekaru Rinshō (1992), BCY]

=== CD ===
- Kadekaru Rinshō Tokushū ("Special Compilation")(1990), Marufuku
- Ryūkyū Festival '91 (1992), Victor
- Utaawase (1993), B/C
- Okinawa Shimauta no Shinzui ("The Essence of Okinawan Island Songs")(1994), Victor
- The Last Session (1996), Toshiba EMI — with Tsuneo Fukuhara
- Kadekaru Rinshō Before/After (1998), B/C

== Filmography ==
- Paradise View (1985), pot repairman
- Untamagirū (1989), old shamisen player
- Kadekaru Rinshō: Uta to Katari ("Songs and Stories")(1994), himself
- Hisai ("Hidden Festival")(1998), Minamikazehara Tokushō
- Beat (1998)
- The Great grandson of the man who drank a cow (1998) — German film
- Nabi no koi ("Nabi's Love")(1999), head of the family
