= China Sadao =

Japanese musician

China Sadao 知名定男
- Born: April 21, 1945 (age 80); Fukuoka Prefecture, Japan
- Occupation: Musician
- Parents: China Teihan (知名定繁) (father); Matsushima Sumiko (松島澄子) (mother)

China Sadao (知名定男, China Sadao) (born 21 April 1945) is a Japanese musician active in the Okinawan music and shima-uta scene, as a performer on the sanshin, min'yō folk singer, song-writer, and producer, having been responsible in 1990 for the formation of the Nēnēs.

== Biography ==
China Sadao was born in Fukuoka Prefecture in 1945, the family moving to Amagasaki in Hyōgo Prefecture in 1951. His father, China Teihan (知名定繁), a musician from Okinawa Prefecture, had moved from Okinawa in search of work, making a living in a spinning mill and by gathering scrap metal from drainage ditches. As a young child, Sadao disliked the nostalgic shima-uta performed by his father and tried to suppress his Okinawan language; he would later recall his embarrassment when his father appeared at an athletics meet with a sanshin and taiko. Nevertheless, he performed in folk songs and dances together with his parents, and in 1951 made his first recording, of the song Deigo Flowers (でいごの花), on the Marufuku Record Label (マルフクレコード). In 1957, father and son returned to Okinawa, where Sadao began his studies, at his father's recommendation, as an uchi-deshi with Okinawan musician Noborikawa Seijin. That same year he made his official debut recording, at the age of twelve, with a performance of the min'yō Suuki kannaa (スーキカンナー). In 1963, after meeting composer Tsuneo Fukuhara, he began to study Western classical music and the classical guitar. His career lasting over sixty years, in December 2020 he performed at a fund-raising concert for the rebuilding of Shuri Castle.

== Select discography ==
- Akabana「赤花」(1978)
- Shima uta「島うた」(1991)
- Shimaya uta-ashibi「島や唄遊び」(1992)
- Ashibi-uta Nasake-bushi「遊び唄 情け節」(1996)
- Utamai「うたまーい」(2005)
- Shima-uta Hyakkei「島唄百景」(2009)

== See also ==
- Ryūkyūan music
- Kina Shōkichi
