= Rinshō =

- Gender: Male

Origin
- Origin: Japanese
- Meaning: Different meanings depending on the kanji used

Rinshō, Rinsho or Rinshou (written: 麟祥 or 林昌) is a masculine Japanese given name. Notable people with the name include:

- Rinshō Kadekaru (嘉手苅 林昌; 1920–1999), Japanese singer
- Mitsukuri Rinsho (箕作 麟祥; 1846–1897), Japanese jurist and educator
