= Akata Sundunchi =

Akata Sundunchi (赤田首里殿内) is a traditional Okinawan song about Maitreya, a Buddhist bodhisattva. The song is named after the Ufuamushirare Temple in Akata Village, part of Shuri, Okinawa.

== Overview ==
The worship of Maitreya, known in Okinawan as Miruku Unkee (弥勒御迎), was adopted by the Ryukyuan religion where he is associated with Nirai Kanai. He was enshrined at the Ufuamushirare Temple near Shuri Castle and received royal patronage from the King of Ryukyu. The song, Akata Sundunchi, was sung during the Maitreya festival on the 16th day of the seventh month of the lunar calendar, which is now held on the Sunday closest to July 16. The festival disappeared during the late 20th century, but was revived and has been held annually since 1994. The song is usually accompanied by sanshin. It has become a popular children's song.

== Lyrics ==
The second verse is sometimes placed after the third, and the fourth is sometimes absent.

Original text

赤田首里殿内(あかたすんどぅんち) 黄金灯籠提(くがにどぅーるーさ)ぎてぃ
うりが灯(あか)がりば 弥勒御迎(みるくうんけー)
Chorus
しーやーぷー しーやーぷー みーみんめー みーみんめー
ひーじんとー ひーじんとー いーゆぬみー いーゆぬみー
東明(あがりあか)がりば 墨習(しみなれー)が行(い)ちゅん
頭結(かしらゆ)てぃ給(たぼー)り 我親加那志(わうやがなし)
Chorus
だいくくぬ弥勒(みるく) 我(わ)が島(しま)に往(い)もち
御拡(うか)きぼせみそーり 弥勒世果報(みるくゆがふ)
Chorus
道々(みちみち)ぬ巷(ちまた) 唄歌(うたうた)てぃ遊(あし)ぶ
弥勒世(みるくゆ)ぬ世果報(ゆがふ) 近(ちか)くなたさ
Chorus

Transliteration

Akata Sundunchi Kuganiduuruusa Giti
Uriga Aka Gariba Miruku Unkee
Chorus
Shiiyaapuu Shiiyaapuu Miiminmee Miiminmee
Hiijintoo Hijintoo Iiyunumii Iiyunumii
Agariaga Gariba Shiminaree Ga Ichun
Kashirayu Ti Taboori Wa Uganashi
Chorus
Daikuku Nu Miruku Wa Ga Shima Ni Imochi
Uka Kibosemisoori Miruku Yugafu
Chorus
Michimichi Nu Chimata Utauta Ti Ashibu
Miruku Yu Nu Yugafu Chikakunasa
Chorus

Translation

Inside Shuri Temple in Akata Village, hang a golden lantern
If it glows brightly, we'll beckon Maitreya Boddhisattva
Chorus
When the sun rises, I will go to school
Please put up your hair for my master
Chorus
Maitreya, please come to my island
Please spread the word of Maitreya's world peace
Chorus
Everyone there will sing songs
It seems that Maitreya's peaceful world is near
Chorus
