= Tadamaru Sakuragawa =

Japanese musician

Sakuragawa Tadamaru
- Born: Tadao Hirata; 2 January 1938; Neyagawa, Osaka Prefecture, Japan
- Occupation: Singer
- Years active: 1947-
- Website: 初代桜川唯丸思い出ページ(Japanese)

From Osaka came the 'musical anarchist' Tadamaru Sakuragawa (桜川 唯丸, Sakuragawa Tadamaru), who sang in a style called Goshu ondo. With the backing of the now disbanded Spiritual Unity, Tadamaru broke out of the festival circuit with his only album, Ullambana, released in 1991. Ullambana is a Sanskrit word that refers to a Buddhism sutra, and is the origin of the Japanese word Urabonne whose shortened form Bon or Obon is now widely used throughout Japan. Tadamaru's music is characterized as a radical new workout of summer festival music from Kansai area of Japan.

The song Yui Maru Bushi from the album can be found here:

- http://www.bbc.co.uk/radio3/world/guidejapan2.shtml
- https://www.youtube.com/watch?v=r1W7EGULc6s

Tadamaru retired in 1995 and passed his name to one of his pupils who now sings as Tadamaru Sakuragawa II (二代目 桜川唯丸).

Music of Japan

== Discography ==
- Ullambana (1990)
