= Kunkunshi =

Music notation system in Japan's Ryukyu Islands

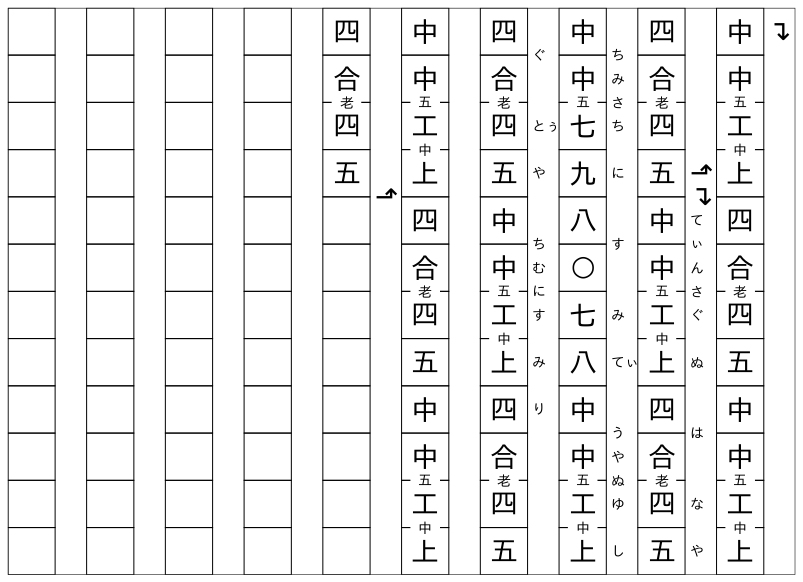
Kunkunshi for the first verse of the Okinawan folk song てぃんさぐぬ花 (Tinsagu nu Hana)

Kunkunshi (Okinawan: 工工四 [kuŋkunɕiː]) is the traditional notation system by which music is recorded in the Ryukyu Islands. The term kunkunshi originally referred to the first three notes of a widely known Chinese melody, although today it is used almost exclusively in reference to the sheet music.

Kunkunshi is believed to have been first developed by Mongaku Terukina or by his student Choki Yakabi in the early to mid-1700s. However, it was not until the end of the 19th century that the form became standardized for writing sanshin music. Yakabi is attributed to having written the earliest known, surviving collection of kunkunshi. The Yakabi Kunkunshi consists of 117 compositions written in the kaki nagashi style. In this form, the sanshin finger positions are written in a flowing style with no indication of rhythm.

== Okinawan sanshin ==
Scale and Reading of the Sanshin with the Relative Tonic sol-fa Reading
	Open String	Index Finger	Middle Finger	Little Finger		
Male String （男弦）	合 (ai)	乙 (otsu)	老 (rō)	下老 (shitarō)		
Male String （男弦）	Do	Re	Mi	Fa		
Middle String （中弦）	四 (shi)	上 (jō)	中 (chū)	尺 (shaku)	尺♯ (shaku sharp)	下尺 (shita shaku)
Middle String （中弦）	Fa	So	La	Ti♭	Ti	Do
Female String （女弦）	工 (kō)	五 (go)	六 (roku)	七 (shichi)	八 (hachi)	九 (kyū)
Female String （女弦）	Do	Re	Mi	Fa	So	La

Characters only Appearing in Vocal Pitch Transcription
才 (sai)	汎 (bon)	勺 (shaku)
So	La	Ti
