= Choichi Terukina =

Ryukyuan classical musician (1932–2022)

- 照喜名朝一
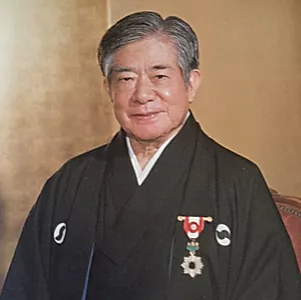
- Born: 15 April 1932; Chinen, Shimajiri District, Okinawa Prefecture, Japan
- Died: 10 September 2022 (aged 90); Naha, Okinawa Prefecture, Japan
- Citizenship: Japanese
- Years active: 1957–2022
- Organization: Ryukyu Koten Afuso-ryu Ongaku Kenkyuu Choichi Kai
- Children: 1

Choichi Terukina (Japanese: 照喜名朝一, Terukina Chōichi, 15 April 1932 – 10 September 2022) was a Japanese Ryukyuan classical musician and sanshin grandmaster.

== Early life ==
Terukina was born in Okinawa on 15 April 1932. When he was 6 years old, he started playing the sanshin, an Okinawan three-stringed instrument. At age 25, Terukina started formal sanshin lessons under Haruyuki Miyazato, a sanshin master. Miyazato's lessons relied more on imitating the teacher's music rather than reading off of musical notes, which is an essential part of uta-sanshin, the style of playing that Terukina taught.

== Career ==
In 1960, Terukina opened his first sanshin dojo, teaching students the Afuso Ryu style of uta-sanshin. He has taught hundreds of students throughout his career as a sanshin grandmaster. In 2000, Terukina was designated as a Living National Treasure of Japan for his mastery of Ryukyuan classical music (koten).

Terukina was the leader of the organization Ryukyu Koten Afuso-ryu Ongaku Kenkyuu Choichi Kai, which has 1,300 members worldwide.

Terukina played at Carnegie Hall in 2019. This was for his 88th lunar birthday, which is a special date in the Okinawan culture known as beiju.

== Personal life and death ==
Terukina had a son named Tomokuni, who also plays the sanshin. Choichi Terukina died at his home in Naha City on 10 September 2022, at the age of 90.
