= Rinken Band =

Traditional Okinawan music band

Rinken Band りんけんバンド
- Genre: Okinawan music
- Years active: 1977-present
- Members: Teruya Rinken; Tomoko Uehara; Katsunori Inafuku; Naoki Enobi; Kaoru Yonamine; Akira Uehara; Kiyohito Yamakawa
- Past members: Hayato Fujiki; Yoshimitsu Gakiya; Yoshimi Kuwae; Toyoharu Ookawa; Mitsuru Tamaki; Kazunari Uechi; Masaaki Uechi; Tsugumi Yonemori
- Website: www.rinken.gr.jp/entertainment/rinkenband/index.html

Rinken Band (りんけんバンド) is an Okinawan band that formed in 1977 and helped popularize their homeland's musical forms and traditional Okinawan music starting in 1985, when their first hit, "Arigatou", was released.

Rinken Band was founded by Rinken Teruya, the son of well-known Okinawan folk music artist Rinsuke Teruya. The band fuses Okinawan folk music, pop, and celebratory eisā traditions to make ballads and dance tunes.

Rinken Band's most recent appearance in the United States was a concert in Oahu, Hawaii. They were featured at the annual Okinawan Festival of 2007.

== Members ==
Rinken Band members
Teruya Rinken	照屋林賢	sanshin	band leader
Tomoko Uehara	上原知子	vocals, drums, sanba, sanshin	joined in 1988
Katsunori Inafuku	稲福克典	vocals, drums	joined in 1993
Naoki Enobi	栄野比尚樹	vocals, drums	joined in 2002
Kaoru Yonamine	與那嶺薫	vocals, drums	joined in 2006
Akira Uehara	上原顕	bass guitar	joined in 1993
Kiyohito Yamakawa	山川清仁	keyboards	joined in 1993
Former members
Hayato Fujiki	藤木勇人	vocals	
Yoshimitsu Gakiya	我喜屋良光	vocals, finger whistle (指笛, yubi-bue)	
Yoshimi Kuwae	桑江良美	vocals, drums	
Toyoharu Ookawa		vocals, drums	
Mitsuru Tamaki	玉城満	vocals	
Kazunari Uechi	上地一成	drums, percussion, vocals	
Masaaki Uechi	上地正昭	bass guitar, vocals	
Tsugumi Yonemori	米盛つぐみ	keyboards, vocals	

== Discography ==
=== Audio CD ===
Year	Title	(Okinawan) Japanese	Label	Notes
1987	Arigatou	ありがとう	Sony Records	
1990	Nankuru	なんくる	Wave	
1991	Rikka	リッカ	Sony Records	mini album (4 songs)
1991	Karahāi	カラハーイ	Sony Records	
1992	Ajimaa	アジマァ	Sony Records	
1993	Rinken Band	りんけんバンド	Sony Records	best selection
1993	Banji	バンジ	Sony Records	
1994	gon gon	ゴンゴン	Sony Records	
1995	Cheren	チェレン	Sony Records	
1996	A Star (Hitotsu bushi)	一つ星	Indies Maker	
1997	Nachi nu fa	夏ぬ子	Sony Records / Indies Maker	
1998	Mantin nu yorokobi	満天ぬ喜び	Indies Maker	
1998	Party (Pārī)	パーリー	Sony Records / Tristar	
1999	Nifee (Nifē)	謝	Indies Maker	
2000	Qing-dahmi	Qing-dahmi (チンダミ)	Indies Maker / The Orchard	Rinken Band Best
2001	Orinasu hibi	織りなす日々	Indies Maker	
2002	Shima-jū shichi-gwachi	島中七月	Indies Maker	Rinken Band Eisā Special
2003	Eisā	EISA (エイサー)	Rent Rack Japan	
2003	Ajimaa no uta	あじまぁのウタ	Rent Rack Japan	
2003	Urizun – Rinken Band New Best	URIZUN～りんけんバンドニューベスト	Sony Records / Gt Music	best selection
2008	Golden Best – Rinken Band	GOLDEN☆BESTりんけんバンド	Sony Records / Phantom Sound & Vision	best selection
2012	Kugani michibushi	黄金三星	Rinken Records	

=== Video / DVD ===
Year	Title	(Okinawan) Japanese	Label	Notes
1992	Njifa	ンジファ	Video Maker	2006 release in DVD format
1995	Tink Tink Tink ... Primal Pulse	ティンクティンク	TC Entertainment	2003 release in DVD format
2004	Pineapple Tours	パイナップルツアーズ	PDD (ピーディディ)	music for the film
2004	Ajimaa no uta, Tomoko Uehara, Tenshi no koe	あじまぁのウタ 上原知子 天使の声	Rent Rack Japan	
2008	Rinken Band Karahāi Live 2007 Kanzen-ban	りんけんバンド カラハーイライブ2007完全版	Video Maker	live concert footage from 2007
