= Kuichaa =

Japanese music genre

Kuichaa (Miyako:; クイチャー), also known as kuichaa-aagu, is a genre of songs from the Miyako Islands, Ryukyu Islands of southwestern Japan. They are performed by a group of young men and women and usually accompany dancing. Like other songs from the Miyako Islands, they have relatively free verse forms. Although Miyako culture is known for epic songs called aagu, kuichaa lean toward lyric songs.

== Songs and dance ==
Hokama Shuzen hypothesized that the etymology of kuichaa was kui (voice, Japanese koe) and ʧaːsu̥ (to combine, Japanese uchi-awasu). As the etymology suggests, kuichaa is characterized by group singing. A group of young men and women forms a circle. The dance is a rhythmical and vigorous one, with arms shaking to and fro and left and right, legs stamping on the ground, dancing high and with hands clapping.

The themes of song vary. For example, a song titled mami ga pana features an ordinary Miyako woman who suffered from the poll tax under the Ryukyu Kingdom.

== Parumizu nu kuichaa ==
The kuichaa commemorating the abolition of the poll tax.

- Pyarumizunu Funatsukinu Sunan Nagunuyo, Yaiyanu Yoima- Nuyuu Sunan Nagunuyo Hinoyoisassai
  - (meaning) The representatives of farmers reached the port of Pyarumizu with the news of the abolition of Nintōzei taxation. The sand of the seashore is
- Awannanari Kuminnanari Agari Kubayo Yaiyanu YohiMah NuYu Agari Kubayo Hinoyoisassai
  - The sand became millet and rice and men of 30 villages now need not work under the heavy Nintōzei taxation system.
- Ugangusu Fujinarabi Burinangamayo Yaiyanu Yoimah Nuyu Burinan Gamanuyoh Hinoyoi Sassai
  - The waves near Ōgami Island became the threads of Miyako Ori, and therefore, women now need not to weave the Miyako Ori under the heavy Nintōzei taxation system.

== Hōnen (Good harvest year) no Kuichaa ==
- Kutushikara Pazumyasiyo Saa Saa Mirukuyunu Nauraba Yoya Naore Saa Saa
- Yoh-iti-ba Yoidakiyo Saa Saa Suruido Kagisanu Yoya Naore
  - Let' begin from this year, If we begin the year of Miroku (Maitreya), the world will change.
  - We hope the world will change. It is the good world if we will do anything in accord.
