= Castanets =

Handheld percussion instrument

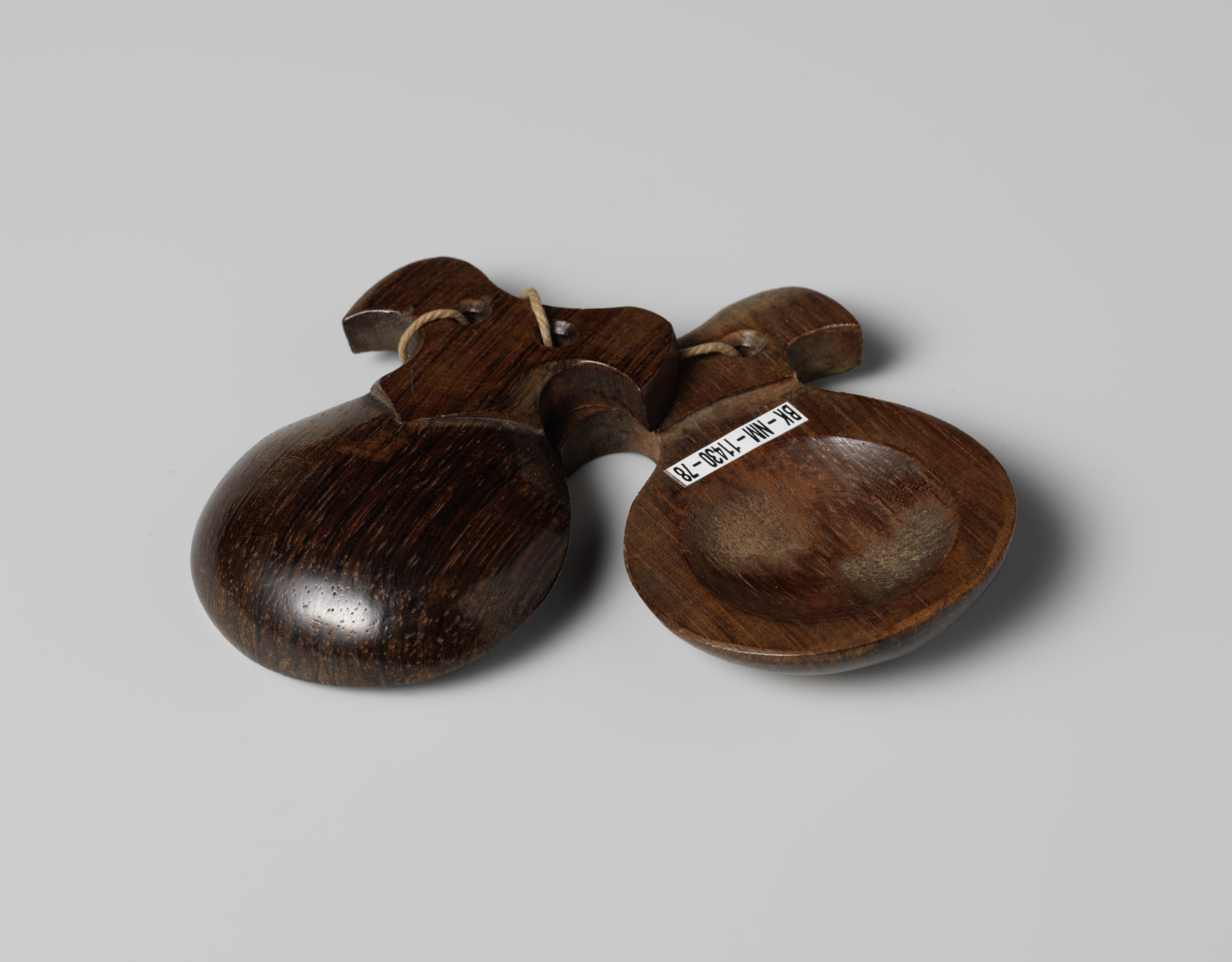
- Castanets

Percussion instrument
- Classification: Hand percussion
- Hornbostel–Sachs classification: 111.141 (Directly struck concussive idiophone)

Related instruments
- Crotalum, Zill

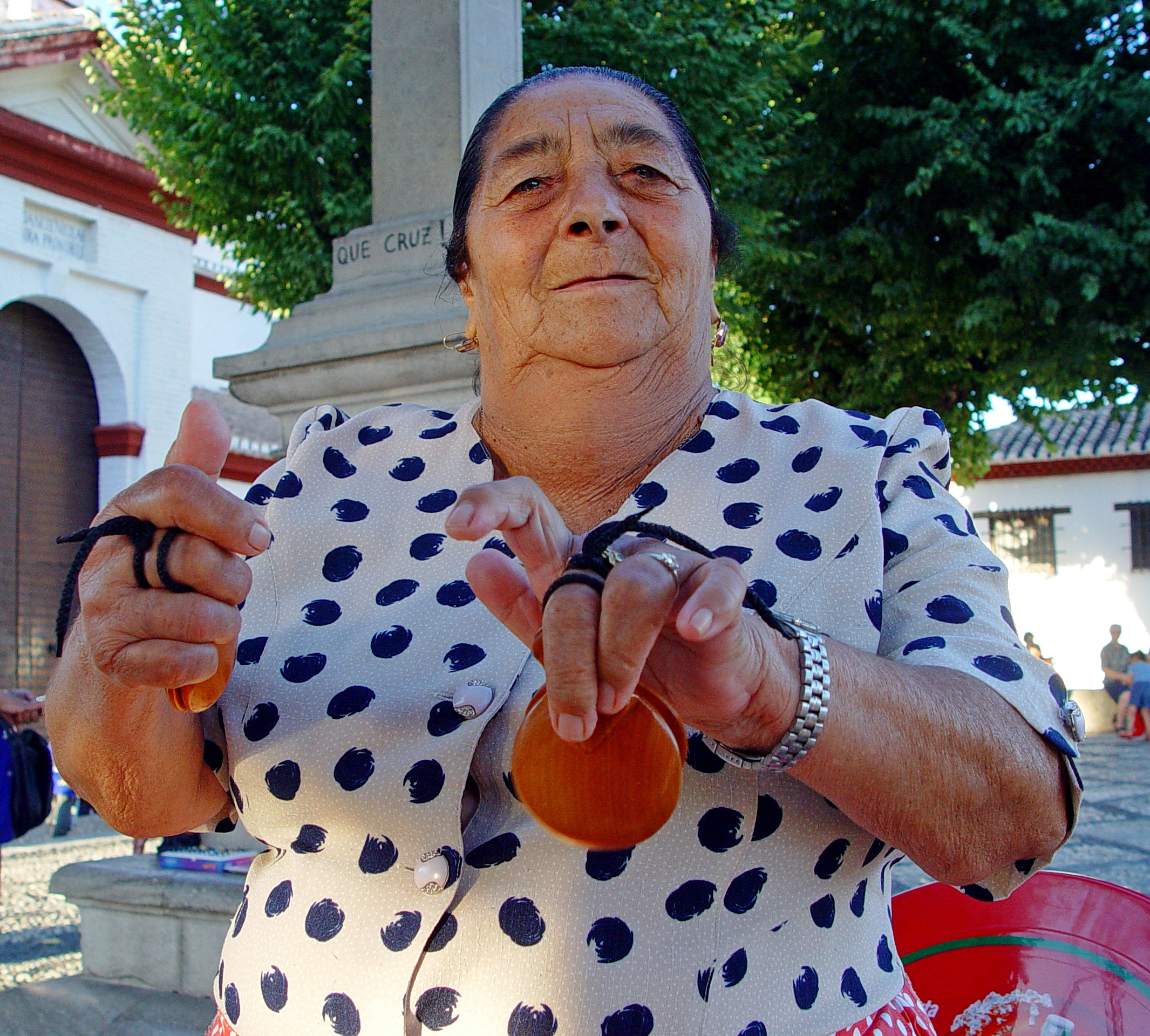
Castanets seller in Granada, Spain

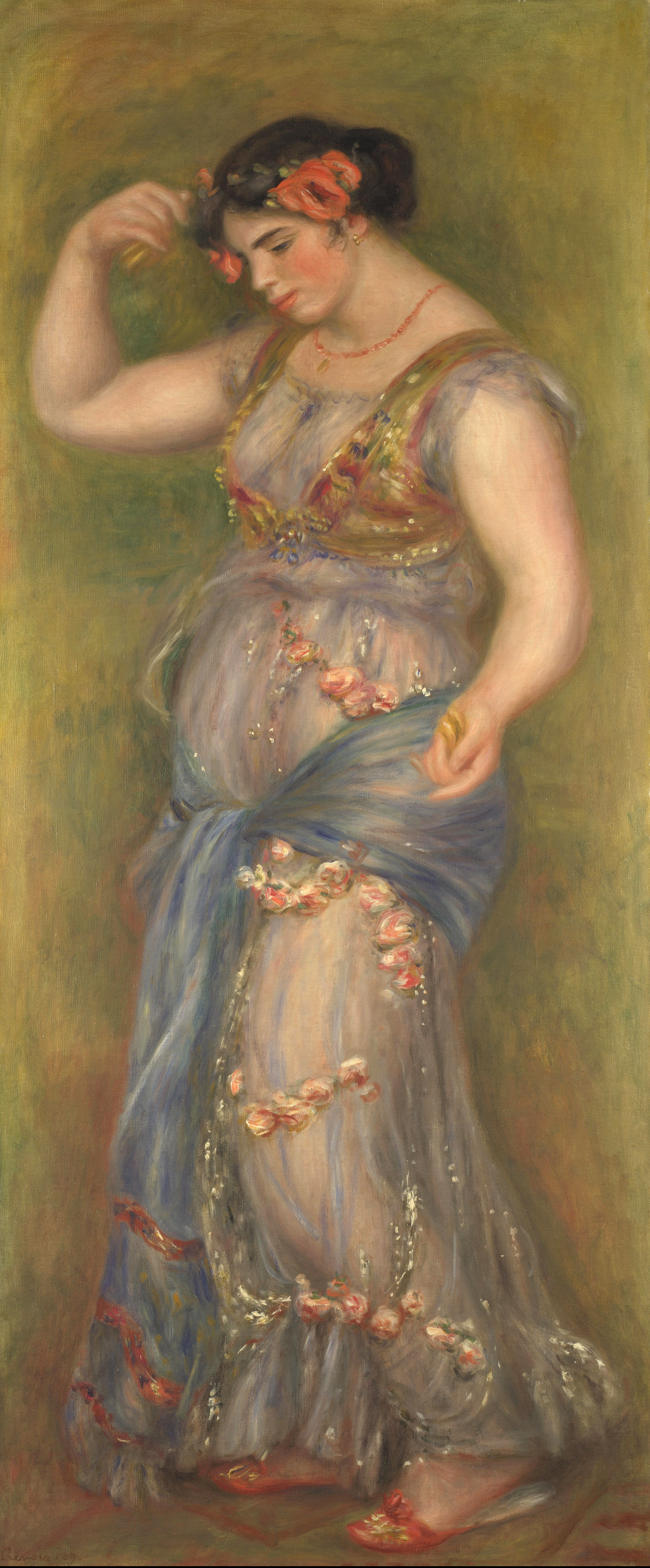
Pierre-Auguste Renoir's 1909 painting Dancing girl with castanets

Castanets, also known as clackers or palillos, are a percussion instrument (idiophonic), used in Spanish, Calé, Moorish, Ottoman, Greek, Italian, Mexican, Sephardic, Portuguese, Filipino, Brazilian, and Swiss music. In ancient Greece and ancient Rome there was a similar instrument called the crotalum.

The name of the musical tool (castanyetes in the Catalán language) comes from the species of castanea (chestnut tree) as the instrument resembles the two halves from the outer shell of the fruit of these kind of trees.

The instrument consists of a pair of concave shells joined on one edge by a string. They are held in the hand and used to produce clicks for rhythmic accents or a ripping or rattling sound consisting of a rapid series of clicks. They are traditionally made of hardwood (chestnut; Spanish: castaño), although fibreglass has become increasingly popular.

In practice, a player usually uses two pairs of castanets. One pair is held in each hand, with the string hooked over the thumb and the castanets resting on the palm with the fingers bent over to support the other side. Each pair will make a sound of a slightly different pitch. The slightly lower one usually marks the beat with joined fingers, whereas the slightly higher one is used for variations with all four fingers, including producing rattle-like sounds.

The origins of the instrument are unclear. The practice of clicking hand-held sticks together to accompany dancing is ancient, and was practiced by both the Greeks and the Egyptians. Most sources relate its historical origins and spread to the Phoenicians travelling and trading throughout the Mediterranean around 3000 years ago, with strong trade relations with what is now Spain. Origins further back in Ancient Egypt (which knew castanet-like instruments made of wood, ivory, and metal) are deemed probable. According to sources, Ancient Romans encountered this instrument among the indigenous population (Iberians and others) of Hispania, already around 200 BC. It soon obtained an important role in folk music in various parts of Spain. In more modern times, the bones and spoons used in Minstrel show and jug band music can also be considered forms of the castanet.

During the Baroque period, castanets featured prominently in dances. Composers like Jean-Baptiste Lully scored them for the music of dances which included Spaniards (Ballet des Nations), Egyptians (Persée, Phaëton), Ethiopians (Persée, Phaëton), and Korybantes (Atys). In addition, they are often scored for dances involving less pleasant characters such as demons (Alceste) and nightmares (Atys). Their association with African dances is even stated in the ballet Flore (1669) by Lully, "... les Africains inventeurs des danses de Castagnettes entrent d'un air plus gai ..."

A rare occasion where the normally accompanying instrument is given concertant solo status is Leonardo Balada's Concertino for Castanets and Orchestra Three Anecdotes (1977). The Conciertino für Kastagnetten und Orchester by the German composer Helmut M. Timpelan, in cooperation with the castanet virtuoso, José de Udaeta, is another solo work for the instrument. See also the Toccata Festiva for castanets by Allan Stephenson. Sonia Amelio has also performed her castanet arrangements as a concert soloist.

In the late Ottoman Empire, köçeks not only danced but played percussion instruments, especially a type of castanet known as the çarpare, which in later times were replaced by metal cymbals called zills.

== Castanets in Spain ==
Castanets are commonly used in several Spanish folk music and dances, such as the Jota, a music/dance probably originated in Aragón, and the Fandango. It spread, partly with these genres, throughout Central Spain/Castile, and Southern parts of Spain. Castanets are also used by singers and dancers in the flamenco genre, especially in some subgenres of it (Siguiriya, and Fandango-influenced ones), and in other dances in Andalusia/South Spain, such as the Sevillanas folk dance and escuela bolera, a balletic dance form. The name (Spanish: castañuelas) is derived from the diminutive form of castaña, the Spanish word for chestnut, which they resemble. In Andalusia they are usually referred to as palillos (little sticks) instead, and this is the name by which they are known in flamenco. In parts of southeastern Spain (like Murcia), castanets are called "postizas", and are played somewhat different (hooked over other fingers).

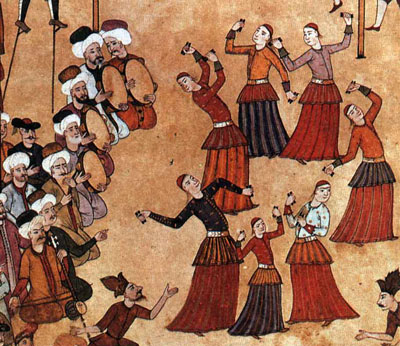
Köçek troupe at 1720 celebration fair at Sultan Ahmed's sons' circumcision.

Castanets were used to evoke a Spanish atmosphere in Georges Bizet's opera, Carmen. They are also found in the "Dance of the Seven Veils" from Richard Strauss' opera Salome and in Richard Wagner's Tannhäuser. An unusual variation on the standard castanets can be found in Darius Milhaud's Les Choëphores, which calls for castanets made of metal. Other uses include Rimsky-Korsakov's Capriccio espagnol, Ravel's Rapsodie espagnole, Francis Poulenc's Concerto for Two Pianos and Orchestra in D minor and Karl Jenkins's Tangollen.

One can also see Spanish influence in the music of Naples through the presence of castanets, as it was registered by Athanasius Kircher on his Tarantella Napoletana (tono hypodorico).

== Mounted castanets ==
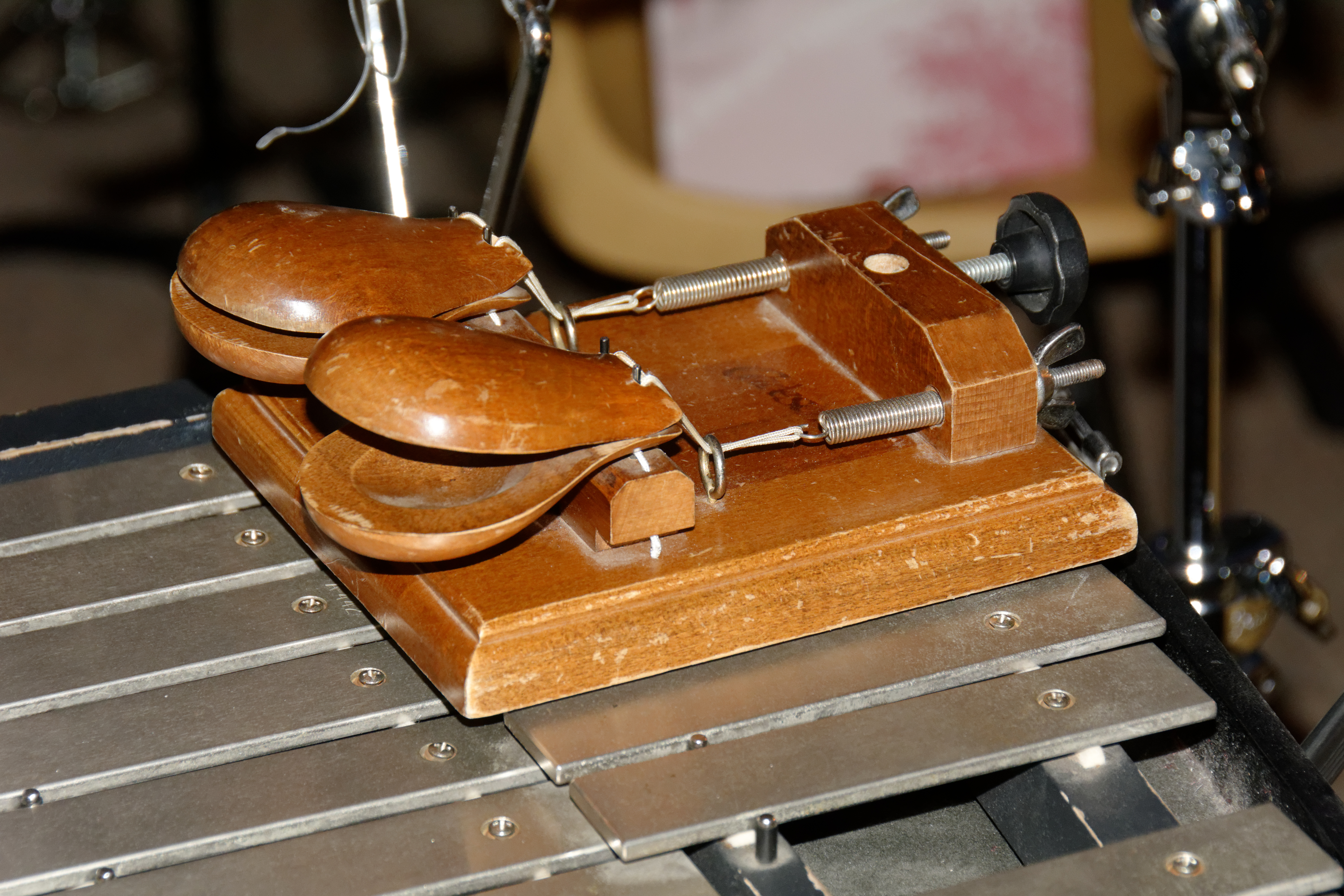
Machine castanets

When used in an orchestral or jug band setting, castanets are sometimes attached to a handle, or mounted to a base to form a pair of machine castanets. This makes them easier to play, but also alters the sound, particularly for the machine castanets. It is possible to produce a roll on a pair of castanets in any of the three ways in which they are held. When held in the hand, they are bounced against the fingers and palm of the hand; on sticks, bouncing between fingers and the player's thigh is one accepted method. For a machine castanet, a less satisfactory roll is obtained by the rapid alternation of the two castanets with the fingers.

== Handle castanets ==
Handle castanets were developed for use in orchestral music. A pair of castanets are fitted onto the end of a straight piece of wood. They are useful for producing a sustained roll, especially loud rolls, on the instrument.

== See also ==
- Chácaras
- Crotalum, which was a kind of clapper/castanet used in religious dances by groups in ancient Greece.
- Krakebs metal clappers, held in the palms from North Africa
- Krap, wood and bamboo clappers from Thailand and Cambodia
- Sanba, which consists of three pieces of wood used in Okinawan music.
- Song loan, similar kind of castanet used in Vietnamese traditional music.
- Zills

== Sources ==
- Forsyth, Cecil (1914). "Castanets". Orchestration. Macmillan / Dover.
- Peinkofer, Karl; Tannigel, Fritz (1976). Handbook of percussion instruments : their characteristics and playing techniques, with illustrations and musical examples from the literature. Mainz / London: Schott. OCLC 604102910.
