= Ryukyuan music =

Ryukyuan music (琉球音楽, Ryūkyū ongaku), also called Nanto music (南島歌謡, Nantō kayō), is an umbrella term that encompasses diverse musical traditions of the Amami, Okinawa, Miyako and Yaeyama Islands of southwestern Japan. The term of "Southern Islands" (南島, Nantō) is preferred by scholars in this field. The word "Ryūkyū" originally referred to Okinawa Island and has a strong association with the highly centralized Ryukyu Kingdom based on Okinawa Island and its high culture practiced by the samurai class in its capital Shuri. By contrast, scholars who cover a much broader region lay emphasis on folk culture.

== Research history ==
Comprehensive studies on diverse musical traditions of the Southern Islands was done by Hokama Shuzen and his colleagues. Prior to that, the scopes of research were limited to each island group (Amami, Okinawa, Miyako, or Yaeyama), or even narrower areas. These studies were done under the heavy influence of folklorists Yanagita Kunio and Orikuchi Shinobu, who searched for the origin of Japanese culture in the Southern Islands.

The research on Okinawa's musical traditions was started by Tajima Risaburō at the end of the 19th century. He was followed by Katō Sango and Majikina Ankō among others. Under Tajima's influence, Iha Fuyū, who is known as the father of Okinawaology, conducted extensive research on a wide range of music genres of Okinawa, primarily by analyzing texts. Although he paid attention to Miyako and Yaeyama, his studies on these subfields remained in a preliminary stage, partly due to the limited availability of documented sources. In Miyako and Yaeyana, pioneering work in collecting and documenting folk songs was done by Inamura Kenpu and Kishaba Eijun, respectively.

Hokama Shuzen, a successor to Iha Fuyū, worked on integrating separate subjects by comparative methods while he himself conducted field studies that covered the whole island chain. He stressed the importance of Amami, which was usually ignored or marginalized in Okinawan narratives. His lifelong research resulted in the Nantō koyō (1971), the Nantō kayō taisei (1978–80) and the Nantō bungaku-ron (1995).

== Classification ==
Hokama (1993)'s classification of songs of the Southern Islands, with some representative examples.
category	subcategory	Amami	Okinawa	Miyako	Yaeyama
child-related	warabe-uta				
child-related	lullaby, "humoring" songs				
ritutal, festival, ceremony	ritutal	nagare-uta	umui, kwēna	tābi	tsïdï
ritutal, festival, ceremony	ritutal	Hirase mankai	amawēda	fusa	mishagu pāsï
ritutal, festival, ceremony	ritutal	omori	tirukuguchi	nīri	
ritutal, festival, ceremony	ritutal	yungutu		pyāshi	
ritutal, festival, ceremony	community-related events	hachigatsu-odori uta	usudaiko	kuichā	yungutu
ritutal, festival, ceremony	community-related events	mochi morai uta	eisā, shichigwachi-mōi	yotsudake-odori	ayō
ritutal, festival, ceremony	community-related events	Kyōdara			jiraba
ritutal, festival, ceremony	community-related events				yunta
ritutal, festival, ceremony	community-related events				hōnensai
ritutal, festival, ceremony	community-related events				setsu-matsuri
ritutal, festival, ceremony	community-related events				tanetori-matsuri
ritutal, festival, ceremony	performing arts	Shodon shibai	Chondarā		Tarama hachigatsu-odori
ritutal, festival, ceremony	performing arts	Yui hōnensai			
ritutal, festival, ceremony	performing arts	Yoron jūgoya-odori			
ritutal, festival, ceremony	home events	shōgatsu-uta	tabigwēna	yometori-uta	yātakabi
ritutal, festival, ceremony	home events	mankaidama	iwai-uta	tabipai no āgu	yomeiri-uta
ritutal, festival, ceremony	home events	gozenfū	iezukuri-uta	iezukuri-uta	nenbutsu
ritutal, festival, ceremony	home events	kuya	nenbutsu	shōgatsu āgu	
work	work songs	itu	sagyō-uta	funakogi āgu	jiraba
work	work songs	taue-uta		awatsuki āgu	yunta
work	work songs			mugitsuki āgu	
work	performing arts		Kunjan sabakui	yonshī	kiyari
entertainment	recreational gatherings (asobi-uta)	shima-uta	myākunī	(kuichā)	fushiuta
entertainment	recreational gatherings (asobi-uta)	kudoki	kuduchi	āgu	tubarāma
entertainment	recreational gatherings (asobi-uta)	rokuchō	tsunahiki-uta	tōgani	sunkani
entertainment	recreational gatherings (asobi-uta)		kachāshī	shunkani	kudoki
entertainment	recreational gatherings (asobi-uta)		zōodori-uta	mōya	
entertainment	new, popular music	shin min'yō	shin min'yō		
entertainment	classical music		classical music		

Musical traditions of the Southern Islands are so diversified that their connections are scarcely recognizable to unaccustomed eyes, but Hokama managed to organize them by cross-island group categories. The table above shows Hokama's classification presented in a volume of the Nihon min'yō taikan (1993). The table below is another classification by Hokama, which includes incantations and dramas.

Another classification of songs of the Southern Islands by Hokama (1995)
category	Amami	Okinawa	Miyako	Yaeyama
magical	kuchi	miseseru	kanfuchi	kanfuchi
magical	tahabë	otakabe	nigōfuchi	nigaifuchi
magical	ogami	tirukuguchi	nigari	takabi
magical	omori	nigēguchi	tābi	nigai
magical	yungutu	ugwan	majinaigutu	yungutu
magical	majinyoi	yungutu		jinnumu
magical		majinaigutu		
epic	nagare-uta	kwēna	nagaāgu	ayō
epic	hachigatsuodori-uta	umui	kuichā-āgu	jiraba
epic		omoro		yunta
epic		tiruru		
lyric	shima-uta (uta)	ryūka (uta)	kuichā	fushiuta
lyric			tōgani	tubarāma
lyric			shunkani	sunkani
drama	Shodon shibai	kumiodori	kumiodori	kumiodori
drama	kyōgen	kyōgen	kyōgen	kyōgen
drama		ningyō-shibai		
drama		kageki		

The first category, "magic", refers to incantations that are chanted or sung with the belief of kotodama. Kume Island of the Okinawa Islands has a large repository of rainmaking spells. For epic songs, Okinawa's kwēna narrates fishing, rice farming, rainmaking, sailing, shipbuilding, house-building, weaving, and other kinds of work in a local community. In addition to these themes, foundation myths, metalworking, war, trade, and funerals are covered by umui. Miyako's āgu is famous for heroic epics. Lyric songs include Amami's shima-uta, Okinawa's ryūka, and Miyako's tōgani, which all have short, fixed verse forms.

== Historical development ==

Cross-island group classifications allowed scholars to investigate the historical development of musical traditions. It became a consensus that magical incantations were the oldest form, from which epic songs evolved. Lyric songs were the most innovative form and emerged from epic songs.

Ono Jūrō presented an evolutionary tree of the songs from the Southern Islands. He also made detailed analysis on song forms. According to Ono, the oldest form was a chain of 5-syllable couplets, which can be found in the Amami and Okinawa Islands but is absent from Miyako and Yaeyama. From the 5-syllable couplets, a 5-3 couplet, or the so-called kwēna form, emerged. The kwēna form spread from Okinawa to Miyako and Yaeyama. In the Ryukyu Kingdom on Okinawa Island, omoro was derived from the kwēna form in the 14th century but rapidly fell into decline at the end of the 16th century. Omoro was replaced by ryūka in Okinawa, which became shima-uta in Amami. Ryūka has a unique 8-8-8-6 syllable pattern. Ono considered that it was formed under the influence of kinsei kouta of mainland Japan, which has the 7-7-7-5 form. Hokama disagreed with Ono and hypothesized an internal development in Okinawa. Miyako and Yaeyama did not embrace the innovative form but created lyric songs using the older 5-3 couplets.

Since Ryūkyū was conquered by Satsuma Domain in the early 17th century, the samurai class in Shuri embraced the high culture of mainland Japan. The name of ryūka itself was coined to distinguish their own uta from waka. With the obvious influence from waka, they transformed songs to be sung into poems to be read.
