= Nēnēs =

Okinawan folk music group

Nēnēs (ネーネーズ) is an Okinawan folk music group formed in 1990 by China Sadao (知名定男). The group name means "sisters" in Okinawan. Nēnēs is composed of four female singers who perform traditional Okinawan folk songs in traditional costume with sanshin accompaniment; they have also performed with a backing band, Sadao China Gakudan. They toured Europe and played New York City in 1994. An independent release, IKAWŪ, landed them a recording contract with Sony Records and a collaboration with Ryuichi Sakamoto. They hold a resident gig at the Live House Shima-Uta club in Naha, Okinawa.

== Members ==
Nēnēs Members
Original Members; 1990–1997	Misako Koja; Yasuko Yoshida; Namiko Miyazato; Yukino Hiyane	古謝 美佐子 吉田 康子 宮里 奈美子 比屋根 幸乃
1997–1999	Yasuko Yoshida; Namiko Miyazato; Yukino Hiyane; Eriko Touma	吉田 康子 宮里 奈美子 比屋根 幸乃 當眞 江里子
1999–2003	Ryōko Koyama; Erina Miyagi; Kiyoka Ikei; Keiko Hirata	小山 良子 宮城 江利奈 伊計 季代花 平田 桂子
2004–present	Ayumi Yonaha; Ayano Higa; Nagisa Uehara; Izumi Kinjō	與那覇 歩 比嘉 綾乃 上原 渚 金城 泉

== Discography ==
Year	Title	Japanese	Label	Notes
1991	IKAWŪ	IKAWŪ (行かうー)	Disc Akabana	
1992	Yunta	ユンタ	Sony Records	
1993	Ashibi	あしび	Sony Records	
1994	Koza Dabasa	コザdabasa	Sony Records	
1995	Nārabi	なーらび	Sony Records	selections featuring Balinese jegog ensemble "Suar Agung"
1995	Natsu – Urizun	夏 ～ うりずん	Sony Records	
1996	Koza – Nēnēs Best Collection	コザ ～ ネーネーズ・ベスト・コレクション	Sony Records	
1997	Akemodoro – Unai	明けもどろ ～ うない	Antinos Records	
2000	Okinawa – Memorial Nēnēs	オキナワ ～ メモリアル・ネーネーズ	Antinos Records	
2002	Chura Uta	美らうた	Dig Records	
2002	Saudade Okinawa – Healing Selection	サウダージ・オキナワ ～ ヒーリングセレクション	Epic Records Japan	
2002	Saudade Uchinā – Nēnēs & Friends Collection	サウダージ・ウチナー ～ ネーネーズ&フレンズ・セレクション	Ki/oon Records	
2004	Nēnēs Golden Best	ネーネーズ GOLDEN☆BEST	Sony Records	
2004	Shū	愁	Dig Records	
2008	Sai	彩	Dig Records	

Nēnēs also sang in the title track of Talvin Singh's Ok album.

== Bibliography ==
- Henry Johnson, Nenes’ Koza Dabasa: Okinawa in the World Music Market. London: Bloomsbury Academic. (2021) ISBN 978-1-5013-5124-2
