= Sanba =

Sanba

Sanba (三板) is a percussion musical instrument from the Okinawa Islands. The name itself means "three slabs" or "three boards/planks," and it consists of three shards of ebony or other woods that are bound together by twine. It produces a variety of clicking sounds similar to that of castanets. It is played by placing the shards between the fingers of one hand, while using the other hand to flick the pieces of wood together. It can be played at slow or fast rhythms, depending on the musical genre. It is often heard in Okinawan folk music.
