= Shima-uta =

Folk music in Amami Islands

Shima-uta (シマウタ, しまうた, 島歌, 島唄, Amami:Simaota, Yoron:Simauta) is a genre of songs originating from the Amami Islands, northern Ryukyu Islands in the southwest of Japan. It became known nationwide in the 2000s with the success of young pop singers from Amami Ōshima such as Hajime Chitose and Atari Kōsuke.

== Names and concepts ==
Although shima-uta is often considered to represent Amami's musical tradition, it is just one of various music genres. Amami's traditional songs can be classified into three categories:

1. kami-uta (religious songs sung by priestesses) including omori, tahabë and kuchi,
2. warabe-uta (children's songs), and
3. min'yo (folk songs).

Amami's min'yo is further divided into three genres:

1. gyōji-uta (songs for annual events) including songs for hachigatsu-odori,
2. shigoto-uta (work songs), associated with rice planting, sailing, etc., and
3. asobi-uta, which are sung at recreational gatherings.

In a narrower sense, shima-uta refers to asobi-uta and is also known as sanshin-uta, zashiki-uta (lit. room songs) and nagusami-uta (lit. comforting songs). In a broader sense, shima-uta also covers gyōji-uta and shigoto-uta.

=== History of conceptualization ===
Today shima-uta is recognized as a genre of songs both in academics and in popular culture. However, musicologist Takahashi Miki shows that recognition has only been developed relatively recently.

The word shima (島) means "island" in Japanese. In Amami Ōshima and other islands, it also means (one's own) community within the island. Such a semantic extension can be understood by the fact that many communities had little contact with the outside because they were geographically isolated by the vast sea in the front and heavy mountains in the back. Thus shima-uta originally means songs transmitted in one's own community. A report states that elderly people only refer to their own community's songs as shima-uta; songs from other communities are not considered shima-uta. In written Japanese, the specialized meaning of shima is sometimes indicated by the use of katakana (シマ), instead of the conventional kanji (島).

In modern Japanese academia, Amami's traditional songs were described by the term min'yo (folk songs), a term which can be found in Shigeno Yūkō's Amami Ōshima minzoku-shi (1927), Kazari Eikichi's Amami Ōshima min'yō taikan (1933) and Nobori Shomu's Dai Amami shi (1949). These authors were influenced by Yanagita Kunio, the father of Japanese folkloristics, who developed the concept of min'yō as a product of society and communal space. Takahashi notes that although Kazari's monograph of 1933 used shima-uta and min'yō apparently interchangeably, the revised edition of 1966 almost exclusively chose min'yō. The term min'yō also gained public acceptance throughout Japan when the national broadcasting organization NHK began to use the term in its radio programs in 1947.

While the natives of the Amami Islands chose the academic term min'yō to describe Amami's traditional songs, some people from outside the Amami Islands used shima-uta proactively. In his preface to Kazari's 1966 book, Shimao Toshio, a novelist from Kanagawa Prefecture, praised shima-uta as "Amami's spirit and embodiment" while he used min'yō in academic contexts, in the hiragana spelling (しまうた). Ogawa Hisao, who was born in Hokkaido but played an important role in publicizing shima-uta, showed a varying attitude toward the word. In his monograph titled Amami min'yō-shi (1979), he exclusively used min'yō, probably due to the book's academic nature. In 1981, however, he published the Amami no shima-uta, where shima-uta was written in kanji (島唄). He noted that while shima-uta had referred to songs of isolated communities, it became increasingly frequent that shima-uta was performed for outsiders. He contrasted Amami's shima-uta with mainland Japanese min'yō, which he thought had been transformed into show business, and he replaced the kanji form (島唄) with katakana (シマウタ) in his Amami shima-uta e no shōtai (1999). Takanashi conjectured that by doing this Ogawa had shown his preference to the traditional shima-uta to the shima-uta that was changing itself rapidly with its success in the mainland Japanese market.

As for popular culture, Takahashi analyzed the Nankai Nichinichi Shinbun, a local newspaper of the Amami Islands, and found that the word shima-uta (島唄, 島歌) gradually replaced min'yō from 1959 to the early 1980s. A similar change can be observed in the titles of records published by Amami Ōshima-based Central Gakki. The transition might have been boosted by the change of the name of Amami's major min'yō content to shima-uta taikai in 1977. In 1979, Tsukiji Shunzō won grand prizes in the All-Japan Folk Song Contest. He was followed by Tōhara Mitsuyo in 1989 and Rikki in 1990. In the 2000s, Hajime Chitose and Atari Kōsuke sang pop songs in the style of shima-uta. This series of events helped make shima-uta become recognized as a regional brand of Amami.

=== Okinawa and The Boom ===
Confusingly, Okinawa Prefecture's folk songs are sometimes referred to as shima-uta, which causes a conflict of interest with those who see shima-uta as a regional brand of Amami. Shima-uta is not a native term of Okinawa, Miyako or Yaeyama but was introduced from Amami in the 1970s. Okinawa's folk songs were simply called uta in local communities and were described as min'yō in academic writing.

Musicologist Takahashi Miki identified two persons who had popularized the term shima-uta in Okinawa Prefecture. One is Nakasone Kōichi, who is known for his research on folk songs of the Amami, Okinawa, Miyako and Yaeyama Islands. He borrowed the term from an Okinawa-based community of Amami people but extended its referent to folk songs of these four archipelagoes. He consistently used the hiragana form (しまうた). Although he contrasted shima-uta with mainland Japanese min'yō, Nakasone's understanding of shima-uta was heavily influenced by Yanagita Kunio. Resisting commercialism, he searched for songs transmitted by local communities.

The other important figure is Uehara Naohiko, a radio personality and songwriter of the Ryukyu Broadcasting Corporation. Around 1970, he visited Amami Ōshima and was taught the name shima-uta by local singers. He stuck to the mixed writing (島うた). He claimed that the name had been used in Okinawa too, but Takahashi found no evidence to support his claim. His notion of shima-uta was drastically different from that of academics: he applied the term not only to traditional folk songs but to shin min'yō (contemporary folk music) and even to pop music. He used his radio programs and musical events to popularize the name shima-uta in Okinawa. Uehara was different from Nakasone in that he engaged in transforming folk songs into popular music.

In 1992, The Boom, a rock band from Yamanashi Prefecture, released an Okinawa-inspired song titled "Shima Uta" (島唄). It became a smash hit in Japanese market and the name shima-uta came to be associated with Okinawa pop in mainland Japan.

== Features ==
Shima-uta is often performed alternatively by a pair of a man and a woman. When one sings, the other must answer. One must choose and sing the most appropriate song in reply to the other's song. This style of performance is called utakake.

Koizumi Fumio analyzed Japanese musical scales with the so-called tetrachord theory. There are four major tetrachords, namely ryūkyū, min'yō, ritsu and miyakobushi. In Northern Amami (Amami Ōshima, Tokunoshima and Kikai Island), the ritsu, min'yō and miyakobushi tetrachords can be found. In this respect, Northern Amami stands in sharp contrast with the Okinawa Islands, where the ryūkyū and ritsu scales are prevalent. Southern Amami (Okinoerabu and Yoron Islands) are similar to northern Okinawa.

Probably the most distinct feature of shima-uta is its extensive use of falsetto, which is usually avoided in mainland Japan and Okinawa. Male and female voices are usually of the same pitch.

Today shima-uta is sung to the accompaniment of the sanshin (shamisen). There is no consensus on when sanshin were introduced to Amami, but it is clear that until recently only wealthy families owned them. In any case, Amami has developed its own variant of sanshin, e.g., using a plectrum (pick) made of thinly sliced bamboo instead of Okinawa's thick plectrum made of water buffalo horn

== Origin ==
Shima-uta shares its 8-8-8-6 syllable structure with Okinawa's ryūka. It is generally agreed by scholars that this is an innovative form that emerged relatively recently. However, there remains a disagreement over exactly how it evolved.

Hokama Shuzen considered that the earliest form of songs were incantations that were sometimes chanted rather than sung. From such incantations, epic songs such as Okinawa's umui and kwēna and Amami's omori and nagare emerged. Epic songs then evolved into lyric songs, including Amami's shima-uta and Okinawa's ryūka. He claimed that the development of lyrical ryūka from epic omoro happened in the 15th to 16th centuries, when Okinawan people were supposedly liberated from religious bondage and began to express personal feelings. He also considered that the introduction of sanshin helped the transition from the long, relatively free verse forms to the short, fixed verse form. As for Amami, Hokama emphasized Amami's internal development from omori to nagare and from nagare to shima-uta. Although shima-uta's 8-8-8-6 syllable structure is likely to have been formed under the influence of Okinawa's ryūka, he considered it of secondary importance.

Ono Jūrō simply saw shima-uta as a derivation from Okinawa's ryūka. He also supported the transition from epic songs to lyric songs. However, his theory is radically different from Hokama's in that the 8-8-8-6 form was formed under the influence of kinsei kouta of mainland Japan, which has the 7-7-7-5 syllable structure. He dismissed the hypothesis that the first stanza of omoro of the later stage partly showed the 8-8-8-6 pattern, which he reanalyzed as kwēna-like 5-3, 5-3, and 5-5-3. He dated the formation of ryūka to the first half of the 17th century, shortly after kinsei kouta became common in mainland Japan.

Ogawa questioned the transition from epic songs to lyric songs. He suggested the possibility that both types of songs had co-existed for a long time. The most critical weakness of his hypothesis is the lack of attested lyric songs from earlier times. He attempted to explain this by their extemporaneous nature: lyric songs, or love songs in particular, must have been quickly replaced while people had a strong incentive to preserve epic songs.

== Notable songs ==
- Asabana bushi (朝花節)
- Bashō nagare (芭蕉ながれ, Amami:Basja nagare)
- Kadeku Nabekana bushi (かでく鍋加那節)
- Kantsume bushi (かんつめ節, Amami:Xancïmïbusi)
- Yachabō bushi (野茶坊節)

== See also ==
- Ryukyuan music
