= Kachāshī =

Type of Okinawan folk dance

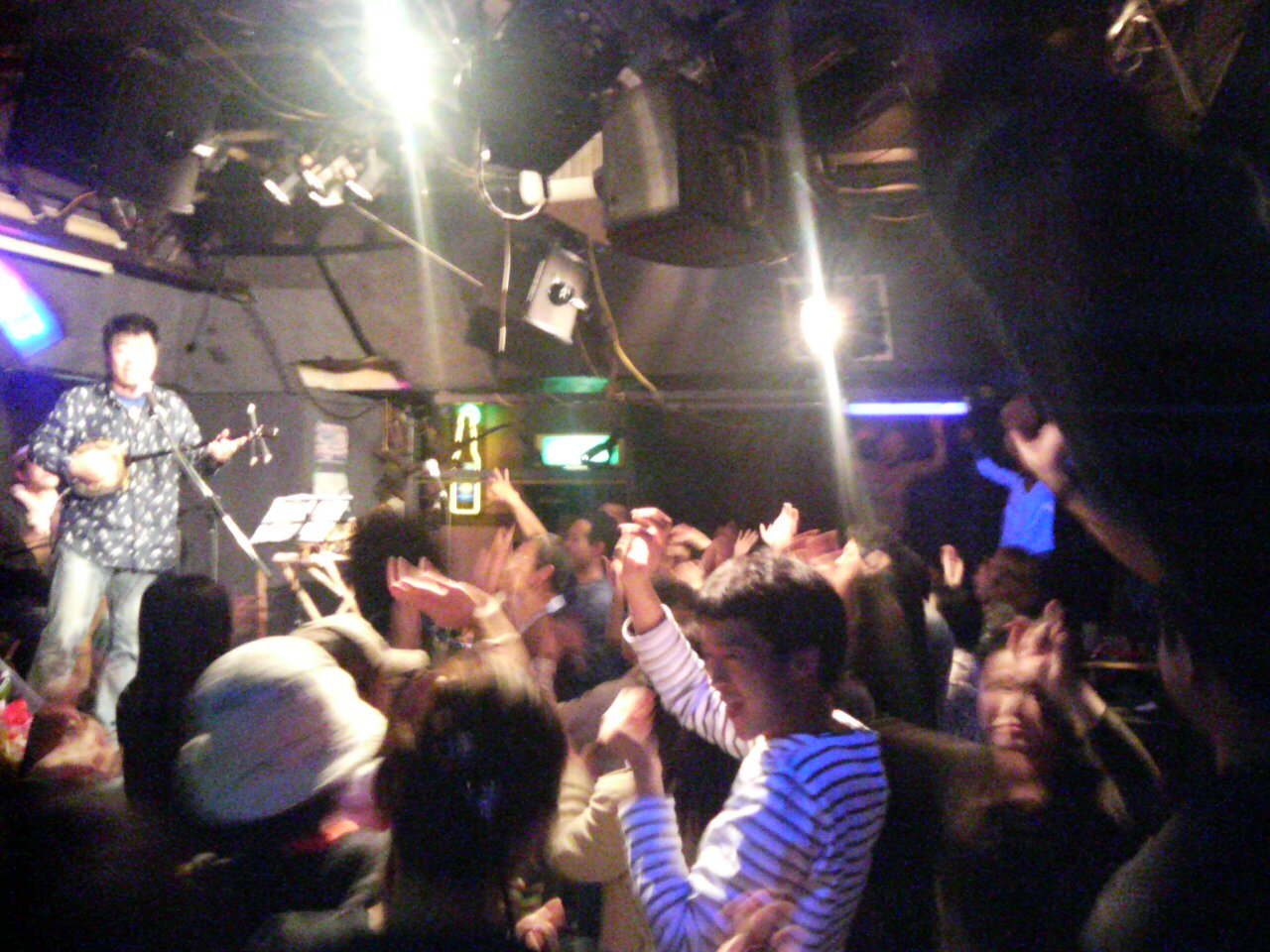
People doing kachāshī, at left a man is playing a sanshin

Kachāshī (カチャーシー), sometimes romanized as katcharsee, is a form of festive Okinawan folk dance. In Okinawa, it is often a feature of celebrations such as weddings and victory festivities after tegumi wrestling matches and public elections. It is traditionally accompanied by the sanshin and drum, and often punctuated with finger whistling called yubi-bue (指笛).

The dance is executed with the hands in the air, palms flat for women and curled (or in fists) for men. The hands alternate pulling and pushing in an up and down elliptical motion, one hand facing outward and up, the other inward and down. The hand movements are difficult to execute without training. The steps are mostly improvised, generally made in a slight bow-legged stance, alternately lifting and lowering the feet to the rhythm.

== Songs ==
- Tooshin dooi (唐船どーい) ("A Chinese Ship is Coming"), the most famous
- Kaadikuuu (嘉手久), for courtship
- Atchamee-gwaa (アッチャメー小)
- Amakawa bushi (天川節)
- Hoonen ondo (豊年音頭)
- Takoo-yama (多幸山)
