= Warabe uta =

Traditional Japanese songs

Warabe uta (童歌) are traditional Japanese songs, similar to nursery rhymes. They are often sung as part of traditional children's games. They are described as a form of min'yo: traditional Japanese songs, usually sung without accompanying instruments.

The centuries-old lyrics are often incomprehensible to modern Japanese (especially to children who are singing it), and others can be quite sinister on close analysis. Like many children's songs around the world, because people are used to them from an early age, they are often oblivious to the real meanings.

== Examples ==
=== Tōryanse ===
"Tōryanse" is often played as an electronic tune at pedestrian crossings in Japan to signal when it is safe to cross.

Japanese:
通りゃんせ 通りゃんせ
ここはどこの 細道じゃ

天神さまの 細道じゃ

ちっと通して 下しゃんせ

御用のないもの 通しゃせぬ

この子の七つの お祝いに
お札を納めに まいります

行きはよいよい 帰りはこわい

こわいながらも
通りゃんせ 通りゃんせ

Romaji:
Tōryanse, tōryanse
Koko wa doko no hosomichi ja?

Tenjin-sama no hosomichi ja

Chitto tōshite kudashanse

Goyō no nai mono tōshasenu

Kono ko no nanatsu no oiwai ni
O-fuda wo osame ni mairimasu

Iki wa yoi yoi, kaeri wa kowai

Kowai nagara mo
Tōryanse, tōryanse

Translation:
Pass through, pass through
What is this narrow pathway here?

It's the narrow pathway of the Tenjin shrine

Please allow me to pass through

Those without good reason shall not pass

To celebrate this child's 7th birthday
I've come to dedicate my offering

Going in will be fine, fine, but returning will be scary

It's scary but
Pass through, pass through

(When infant mortality was high, people traditionally celebrated when a child survived to reach the age of 7. See Shichigosan)

This particular warabe-uta is sung as part of a traditional game identical to "London Bridge Is Falling Down". Two children facing each other link their hands to form an arch 'checkpoint', and the remaining children walk through underneath in a line (and back round again in circles). The child who happens to be under the arch when the song finishes is then 'caught'.

The tune is played at Japanese pedestrian crossings by analogy with this game, i.e., it is safe to cross until the music stops.

=== Teru-teru-bōzu ===
A teru teru bōzu is a little traditional hand-made doll which supposedly brings sunshine. "Teru" is a Japanese verb which describes sunshine, and a "bōzu" is a Buddhist monk. Children make teru-teru-bōzu out of tissue paper and a string and hang them from a window to wish for sunny weather. There is a famous warabe uta which is about the small ghost-like dolls which people can see hanging on rainy days.

Japanese:
てるてるぼうず、てるぼうず
明日天気にしてをくれ
いつかの夢の空のよに
晴れたら金の鈴あげよ

てるてるぼうず、てるぼうず
明日天気にしてをくれ
私の願いを聞いたなら
甘いお酒をたんと飲ましょ

てるてるぼうず、てるぼうず
明日天気にしてをくれ
それでも曇って泣いてたら
そなたの首をちょんと切るぞ

Romaji:
Teru-teru-bōzu, teru bōzu
Ashita tenki ni shite o-kure
Itsuka no yume no sora no yo ni
Haretara kin no suzu ageyo

Teru-teru-bōzu, teru bōzu
Ashita tenki ni shite o-kure
Watashi no negai wo kiita nara
Amai o-sake wo tanto nomasho

Teru-teru-bōzu, teru bōzu
Ashita tenki ni shite o-kure
Sore de mo kumotte naitetara
Sonata no kubi wo chon to kiru zo

Translation:
Teru-teru-bozu, teru bozu
Do make tomorrow a sunny day
Like the sky in a dream sometime
If it's sunny I'll give you a golden bell

Teru-teru-bozu, teru bozu
Do make tomorrow a sunny day
If you make my wish come true
We'll drink lots of sweet sake

Teru-teru-bozu, teru bozu
Do make tomorrow a sunny day
but if it's cloudy and I find you crying (i.e. it's raining)
Then I shall snip your head off

The lyrics are allegedly about a story of a monk who promised farmers to stop rain and bring clear weather during a prolonged period of rain which was ruining crops. When the monk failed to bring sunshine, he was executed.

=== Yuki ===
Yuki (雪) is a song Japanese children sing when it's snowing and they want to play outside. 'Yuki' means 'Snow' in Japanese. The song is also commonly known as 雪やこんこ (Yuki ya konko) The snow falls densely.

Japanese:
雪やこんこ 霰やこんこ
降っては降っては ずんずん積る
山も野原も 綿帽子かぶり
枯木残らず 花が咲く

雪やこんこ 霰やこんこ
降っても降っても まだ降りやまぬ
犬は喜び 庭駈けまわり
猫は火燵で 丸くなる

Romaji:
yuki ya konko, arare ya konko
futtewa futtewa zunzun tsumoru
yama mo nohara mo wataboshi kaburi
kareki nokorazu hana ga saku

yuki ya konko, arare ya konko
futtemo, futtemo, mada furiyamanu
inu wa yorokobi, niwa kakemawari
neko wa kotatsu de marukunaru

Translation:
The snow falls densely, the hail falls densely!
It's falling and falling, collecting more and more.
The mountains and the fields are also wearing their cotton hats,
and in every tree flowers bloom.

The snow falls densely, the hail falls densely!
It's still falling and falling, never stopping.
The dog is happy, running around the garden,
the cat is curled up under the kotatsu.

A kotatsu is a low, heated table. In the first stanza, flowers blooming in winter probably refers to the snow collecting on empty branches. The literal translation of the line is something like "No withered trees remaining, flowers bloom".
