= Academic analysis of themes in Royal Space Force: The Wings of Honnêamise =

Studies of the 1987 anime film

Royal Space Force: The Wings of Honnêamise, the 1987 debut work of Gainax written and directed by Hiroyuki Yamaga, has attracted academic analysis of its themes in various formats, including dissertations, scholarly journals, university press books, and installations.

An early analysis of Royal Space Force was offered during the doctoral studies of Takashi Murakami, later to be recognized internationally for his Superflat movement in contemporary art (Note: Alexandra Munroe, senior curator of Asian art at the Guggenheim, argues that Superflat makes a "stronger assault" on the boundaries between the fine arts and pop culture than did the Pop Art movement of Andy Warhol.) that centered a concept of otaku culture as an expression of unresolved Japanese societal trauma following the end of the Second World War. This conception was itself critiqued in an analysis of Royal Space Force by Swedish scholar Viktor Eikman, who argued against the finding of WWII parallels in Gainax's foundational work. University of Melbourne professor of screen and cultural studies Sean Cubitt compared Royal Space Force to the Indian and Chinese films 1942: A Love Story and Once Upon a Time in China through a shared examination of temporality, whereas Penn State comparative literature professor Shu Kuge examined the film through the motif of physical space rather than time, associating a mimesis of distance in Royal Space Force with that found in the Makoto Shinkai anime Voices of a Distant Star.

== Academic analysis of themes ==
The rhythmic movements of cosmic planets existed before human civilization. We may try to bestow humanistic meanings to the universe, but it is essentially indifferent to us and beyond our interpretations. The history of human civilization teaches us that "purposes" and "missions" are often used as sacrosanct excuses to commit violence. It is accepted as a truism that humans need to fight for some ideal goals to sustain civilization. At one point in [Royal Space Force], an interviewer asks Shirotsugh to talk about the "purpose" (shimei) of his mission. Shirotsugh does not know how to answer this question ... but he is certainly affected by the question. The later part of the movie suggests that Shirotsugh’s adamant ignorance or, say, innocence implies that not having a purpose is his purpose; his mission has a point because it is blatantly useless. In fact, every military man and politician ridicules his mission ... Shirotsugh’s lack of purpose (which also means not having a military force to destroy or to subjugate others) is an oblique political gesture against intrinsically war-driven human civilization, yet he still cannot escape from such a world in turmoil. His prayer at the end of the film means not only his hope for a better future but also his unconditional acceptance of this world.

=== Murakami's Sea Breeze as analysis of film ===
Paul Schimmel remarked that Sea Breeze was originally created for a group exhibition in Tokyo that Murakami saw "as an opportunity to take on several of the leading artists of his generation, including Kenji Yanobe and Kodai Nakahara, whom he held in high regard." The exhibition, Anomaly, was described by QAGOMA curator Reuben Keehan as an "extremely important" event in the history of the Neo-pop art movement, although Orion Martin, a contemporary painter who has exhibited at the Whitney Museum, asserted that in critical reviews of Murakami's art, Sea Breeze's reference to Royal Space Force "goes largely unmentioned" and that the work "looks nothing like the kawaii-branded icons he would later become famous for."

Royal Space Force attracted a broader academic analysis as early as 1992, when Takashi Murakami referenced the film through Sea Breeze, an installation created during his doctoral studies in nihonga at Tokyo University of the Arts. The installation piece was described as "a ring of enormous, 1000-watt mercury spotlights that emitted a powerful blast of heat and blinding light when a roller shutter was raised ... Sea Breeze neatly aligned two major threads in Murakami’s practice of the time: the legacy of the war and its attendant ideologies of imperial divinity and the uniqueness of the Japanese people, and a burgeoning fascination with consumer culture and otaku creativity ... the circular of lights was based on a close-up of rocket engines firing during a space launch in the anime Royal Space Force: [The] Wings of Honneamise." Hiroyuki Yamaga’s remark on Royal Space Force, "We wanted to create a world, and we wanted to look at it from space" would be quoted as an epigram in the catalog of the 2001–04 exhibition headlined by Murakami, My Reality—Contemporary Art and the Culture of Japanese Animation, by which time Murakami was described as a "pivotal figure" among contemporary artists "inundated with manga and anime—and with concepts of the new Japan, which was wrestling with a sense of self-identity as an increasingly strong part of the modern capitalistic world, yet was tied to a long and distinguished past." A previous Murakami exhibition in 1999 had noted that the artist's "notorious sculpture" My Lonesome Cowboy was "created at the suggestion of Toshio Okada, the [Gainax] animation film producer".

In a March 1992 roundtable discussion with the widely acclaimed Japanese arts magazine Bijutsu Techō, Murakami remarked that he "... found it commendable that otaku were dedicated to 'the invention of a new technique, especially through the use of overlooked elements, finding an "empty space" between existing methods of production or criteria for judging works.' He maintained that art must find the same 'empty space' to revolutionize itself." Sea Breeze was " ... contained in a square box on wheels ... when switched on, the intense heat and dazzling flash of the lights evoke the moment of its launch ... Gainax represented, for Murakami, a model of marginalized yet cutting-edge cultural production. Referring to their film was Murakami's homage to Gainax's independent spirit. At the same time, the fact that the burning wheel was contained inside a box signified passion confined within a conventional frame, evoking the failure of Honneamise to present a uniquely Japanese expression as it remained under the influence of Western science-fiction films." Murakami would later assert, two years after its initial debut, that Sea Breeze "does not have any concept. Just an enormous work [whose] ground of art is collapsed," yet in 1999 remarked further of the piece that, "sadly, this indoor artworld spectacle was the closest the Japanese would get to a space program".

=== Critique of Murakami's conception of otaku art ===
Murakami would express a specific historical conception of otaku during a discussion with Toshio Okada conducted for the 2005 exhibition Little Boy: The Arts of Japan's Exploding Subculture, addressing Okada with the premise: "After Japan experienced defeat in World War II, it gave birth to a distinctive phenomenon, which has gradually degenerated into a uniquely Japanese culture ... [you] are at the very center of this otaku culture", further asserting in an essay for the exhibit catalog that therefore "otaku ... all are ultimately defined by their relentless references to a humiliated self". This historical positioning of otaku culture would itself be challenged through an analysis of Royal Space Force by Viktor Eikman, who cites Murakami's statement in the same essay that the anime studio that made the film occupied "a central place in the current anime world... [they were] professionally incorporated as Gainax in 1984 upon production of the feature-length anime The Wings of Honneamise (released in 1987)" but that the two Gainax works discussed by Murakami in his theory of otaku were the Daicon IV Opening Animation and Neon Genesis Evangelion. Eikman argues that the theory should be tested also against "other works by the same studio, made by the same people for the same audience, but not analysed [in the essay] by Murakami". Of Royal Space Force, Eikman contended, "At most we may view the humiliated Shiro’s mission as symbolic of Japan’s desire to join the Space Race in particular and the 'big boy' struggles of the Cold War in general, a desire which plays into the sense of childish impotence described by Murakami, but even that is a very speculative hypothesis," arguing that "it is remarkably hard to find parallels to World War II" in the film. Eikman proposes a possible "weak analogy" in Royal Space Force to the Japanese attack on Pearl Harbor through the theory of an opposing nation being permitted to attack the launch site in order to provide a casus belli, but suggests such an analogy would "inappropriately cast Shiro as an American".

=== Temporality and atemporality ===
In 2004's The Cinema Effect, a historical survey examining film through "the question of temporality", Sean Cubitt presents an argument grouping Royal Space Force together with Vidhu Vinod Chopra’s 1942: A Love Story and Tsui Hark’s Once Upon a Time in China as examples of "revisionary" films, distinct from "revisionist" works in that they "do not so much revise [their] history as revision it, look into it with a new mode of envisioning the relationship between the past and the present ... they displace the fate of the present, opening instead a vista onto an elsewhere...ready to forsake the Western ideal of realism [for] the possibility of understanding how they might remake the past and so make the present other than it is." Cubitt proposes that in Royal Space Force "the future emerges as an alternative past ... the film envisions [a country of] lamplighters and steam trains, trams, and prop-driven warplanes, a universe that the Meiji modernization ... might have arrived at had it not been urged along other routes by its exposure to Western technology." A diegesis structured between town and country is seen by Cubitt in the persons of Shiro and Riquinni and their evocation of the "urban-rural continuum" present in Japan's particular experience of modernization, dependent upon "the mythic standing of rice as the medium of 'commensality,' of sharing, hospitality, connection to the gods, the environment, and the cycles of sexual reproduction. In the imaginary country of Honnêamise, the humble bowl of 'terish' seems to work in the same way, a dish whose origin is not clarified in a brief shot of harvesting what might be wheat or millet. The offering and sharing of food brings the stranger into the community in a way that idle urban drinking and gambling cannot."

Cubitt, like Murakami, references the historical consequences of World War II, but in citing a speech by Japan's first postwar prime minister Naruhiko Higashikuni on the need for "nationwide collective repentance," suggests that such repentance is "the theme that seems to resonate in the curious, slow budding" of Royal Space Force through Riquinni's "homemade religion of renunciation and impending judgment" arguing that such a philosophy is evoked also through the film's animation style: "Often a minor fluctuation is all there is to denote the atmosphere or emotion of a scene ... The appeal to a sophisticated audience's ability to decipher these small motions grows into an overall impression of lassitude before a world and a life well worth renouncing" and that "the two major action sequences, the chase and death of the assassin and the launch sequence, cut in the frame, the edit and the construction of depth, but they resolve into the absolute indifference of movements in equilibrium. Like the zero of the Lumières' flickering views, the action of [Royal Space Force] sums at nothingness, a zero degree of the political that removes its resolution from history, and from time itself, into the atemporal zone denoted by Shirotsugh's orbit ... an empty place from which alone the strife of warfare and suffering sinks into pure regret, not so much an end as an exit from history."

=== Physical distance and personal relationships ===
In contrast, Shu Kuge, in a 2007 essay in the journal Mechademia, sees Shiro's position in space at film's end as "not the denial of history but the empathetic move to accept the cruel world without translating it into a metaphysical meaning". Kuge groups the connection between Shiro and Riquinni with that between Mikako Nagamine and Noboru Terao in Makoto Shinkai's Voices of a Distant Star as examples of a personal connection that, although under different circumstances in each story, is in either case a relationship sustained by the spatial distance between two people: "[they] sustain the distance rather than shrink it because sustaining ... is crucial for their relationships to be vast and generous. The topological relationship between the floating and the remaining is actually a mimesis of a stellar relationship, such as the moon and the earth, the earth and the sun. Repetitive references to 'stars' in these movies should not be understood as metaphors; the characters in these anime aspire to become stars in space so as to overcome human dimensions..." Kuge suggests a mutual personal attraction is indeed present between Riquinni and Shiro, but that "Riquinni maintains distance from Shirotsugh and leaves herself as an object of desire somewhat obscure, probably because she fears that physical proximity as well as the clarity of her interest diminishes a certain degree of her and his curiosity in their relationship. It is not that she is a tease, but she seems to know that ongoing curiosity, a drive toward the unknown, makes life more valuable; therefore, they can take care of each other better. In other words, the unknown should be sustained. Spatially speaking, curiosity is possible when the contact of the two bodies is suspended."

Kuge further asserts "... They 'communicate' best when they have a physical distance between them...Shirotsugh visits Riquinni the day before he leaves for his mission, but she is not at home. He then hops into a trolley car, and Riquinni almost simultaneously steps out from the same car. She turns and recognizes Shirotsugh on board. They do not talk, but she smiles at him. As the trolley car slowly begins to move, Shirotsugh smiles back, saying 'Ittekimasu,' which literally means 'I am going,' a greeting that can be uttered only between family members and close friends. (Note: Riquinni responds with "itterasshai", which would also be the expected familiar reply of one who awaits a person's return. Kuge, a Japanese artist writing in English, makes note of the usages of the film's original language at several points in his analysis, including observing that "Shirotsugh" is an alternate romanization of an actual given name in Japanese, Shirotsugu (「代次」「四郎次」).) This scene lasts for less than thirty seconds, yet it demonstrates effectively and poetically what their relationship is. The physical distance between these two people connects them and sustains them in a particular continuity, although they appear not to share the same space. The same continuity also preserves the erotic energy between them. Collapsing this distance can mean the end of their relationship." Noting the struggle between the armed forces of Honnêamise and the Republic to control the same physical territory, Kuge comments that by contrast the Royal Space Force does not in fact "possess any military force," and suggests that likewise the personal nature of Shiro and Riquinni's relationship depends upon respecting the physical separation and boundaries that she seeks to maintain and which he seeks to violate, and does violate, before they are reaffirmed in the latter part of the film. "It is not a coincidence that Shirotsugh's enthusiasm for space arises right after he meets Riquinni, who promotes the world of mythos that preserves the unknown (because it does not inquire about the 'essence' of all that is), instead of that of logos, or logical reasoning, which rationalizes physical phenomena. As she sustains her distance from him, his curiosity toward her is also transposed to an unknown territory, that is, outer space. When Shirotsugh reaches the unknown, there is no physical contact. All he can do is float. He seems to realize that the world indeed has no boundaries; in fact, he can float in this one continuous spatiality that includes everything. Being sustained by this vast distance, Shirotsugh prays, as if it were the only way to tell others the grandeur of this world."

== Works cited ==
- Cruz, Amanda (2000). "DOB in the Land of Otaku". Takashi Murakami: The Meaning of the Nonsense of the Meaning. New York: Harry N. Abrams. ISBN 978-0810967021.
- Cubitt, Sean (2004). The Cinema Effect. Cambridge: The MIT Press. ISBN 978-0262532778.
- Eikman, Viktor (January 2007). Exotic Geeks: Problematizing Japanese and Western Anime Otaku (Thesis). Gothenburg: University of Gothenburg.
- Fleming, Jeff (2001). "My Reality, Your Reality". My Reality: Contemporary Art and the Culture of Japanese Animation. New York: Des Moines Art Center & Independent Curators International. ISBN 1-879003-33-3.
- Friis-Hansen, Dana (2000). "The Meaning of Murakami's Nonsense: About 'Japan' Itself". Takashi Murakami: The Meaning of the Nonsense of the Meaning. New York: Harry N. Abrams. ISBN 978-0810967021.
- Keehan, Reuben (2017). "The Bubble Goes Pop: Takashi Murakami and the Early Days of Tokyo Neo-Pop". Takashi Murakami: The Octopus Eats Its Own Leg. New York: Rizzoli. ISBN 978-0847859115.
- Kuge, Shu (2007). "In the World That Is Infinitely Inclusive: Four Theses on Voices of a Distant Star and The Wings of Honneamise". Mechademia. Vol. 2. Minneapolis: University of Minnesota Press.
- Martin, Orion (Fall–Winter 2017). "GEISAI: Murakami's Bid to Shape Japan's Art World". LEAP (Bilingual text in English and Chinese). Shanghai: Modern Media Group.
- Matsui, Midori (2007). "Murakami Matrix: Takashi Murakami's Instrumentalization of Japanese Postmodern Culture". ©Murakami. New York: Rizzoli. ISBN 978-0847830039.
- Mizuno, Hiroyasu, ed. (March 6, 2015). "Arts book publisher Bijutsu Shuppan-sha files for court protection". japantimes.co.jp. The Japan Times.
- Morikawa, Kaichiro; Murakami, Takashi; Okada, Toshio (2005). "Otaku Talk". Little Boy: The Arts of Japan's Exploding Subculture (Bilingual text in English and Japanese). New Haven: Yale University Press. ISBN 978-0300102857.
- Munroe, Alexandra (2005). "Introducing Little Boy". Little Boy: The Arts of Japan's Exploding Subculture (Bilingual text in English and Japanese). New Haven: Yale University Press. ISBN 978-0300102857.
- Murakami, Takashi (2005). "Earth in My Window". Little Boy: The Arts of Japan's Exploding Subculture (Bilingual text in English and Japanese). New Haven: Yale University Press. ISBN 978-0300102857.
- Phipps, Laura; Sherman, Elisabeth (February 20, 2016). "On Unstable Ground". whitney.org. Whitney Museum of American Art.
- Schimmel, Paul (2007). "Making Murakami". @Murakami. New York: Rizzoli. ISBN 9780847830039.
