= Lagerfeld =

Lagerfeld is a surname. Notable people with the surname include:

- Cardinal Lagerfield, a character in the video game Resonance of Fate
- Karl Lagerfeld (1933–2019), German fashion designer, artist, and photographer
- Otto Lagerfeld (1881–1967), German businessman
- Steven Lagerfeld, editor of The Wilson Quarterly

== See also ==
- Lagerfelt
