= Chiaki =

- Gender: Unisex

Origin
- Origin: Japanese
- Meaning: different meanings depending on the kanji used

Other names
- Related names: Chiharu; Chinatsu

Chiaki (ちあき, チアキ) is a unisex Japanese given name used mostly by females and is occasionally used as a surname.

== Written forms ==
Chiaki can be written using different kanji characters and can mean:

- 千秋, "thousand, autumn"
- 千明, "thousand, light"
- 千晶, "thousand, sparkle"
- 千晃, "thousand, clear"
- 千瑛, "thousand, crystal ball"
- 智昭, "wisdom, shining"

The name can also be written in hiragana or katakana.

== People ==
- Chiaki (tarento) (千秋; born 1971), Japanese tarento
- Chiaki Hayashi (林 千晶), Japanese businesswoman
- Chiaki Ishibashi (石橋 千彰; born 1991), Japanese swimmer
- Chiaki Ishikawa (智晶; born 1969), Japanese singer
- Chiaki Ishioka (石岡 千秋; born 1961), Japanese alpine skier
- Chiaki Ito (千晃; born 1987), member of the J-pop group AAA
- Chiaki J. Konaka (千昭; born 1961), Japanese writer and scenarist
- Chiaki Kawamata (千秋; born 1948), Japanese science fiction writer and critic
- Chiaki Kobayashi (小林 千晃; born 1994), Japanese voice actor
- Chiaki Kon (千秋), Japanese anime director
- Chiaki Kuriyama (千明; born 1984), Japanese actress, singer, and model
- Chiaki Kyan (ちあき; born 1986), Japanese singer
- Chiaki Matsumura (松村 千秋; born 1992), Japanese curler
- Chiaki Minamiyama (南山 千明; born 1985), Japanese women's footballer
- Chiaki Morosawa (千晶; born 1959), a Japanese anime screenwriter
- Chiaki Mukai (千秋; born 1952), Japanese doctor and astronaut
- Chiaki Ohara (千秋), Japanese pianist
- Chiaki Omigawa (千明; born 1989), Japanese voice actress
- Chiaki Satō (千亜妃; born 1988), Japanese actress and musician
- Chiaki Takahashi (たかはし 智秋; born 1977), Japanese voice actress
- Chiaki Takahashi (politician) (高橋 千秋; born 1956), Japanese politician
- Chiaki Yamada (山田 千愛; born 1966), Japanese women's footballer
- Naomi Chiaki (ちあき; born 1947), Japanese singer

== Fictional characters ==
- Chiaki Nagoya (千秋), a character in the manga/anime series Kamikaze Kaito Jeanne
- Chiaki Konoike (千秋), a character in the manga series Tenjho Tenge
- Chiaki Minami (千秋), a character in the manga series Minami-ke
- Chiaki Saionji, a central character in the manga series The Demon Ororon
- Chiaki Tani (千明), a character in Samurai Sentai Shinkenger
- Chiaki Mamiya, a major character in The Girl Who Leapt Through Time
- Shinichi Chiaki (千秋), a central character in Nodame Cantabile series
- Chiaki Tachibana, a character in the video game Shin Megami Tensei III: Nocturne
- Chiaki Yoshino (千秋), a male manga artist that pretends he is a female to the readers in the manga and anime series Sekaiichi Hatsukoi
- Chiaki Kurihara, a central character in the anime series Bodacious Space Pirates
- Chiaki Shinoda, a character in the anime Darker Than Black
- Chiaki Nanami (千秋) a main character in the video game Danganronpa 2: Goodbye Despair
- Chiaki Enno, a character in Zenki
- Chiaki Morisawa (守沢 千秋), a character in idol rhythm game Ensemble Stars!
- Chiaki Koizumi (千秋), a character in the webcomic Rain
- Chiaki Ōgaki (千明), a character in the manga series Laid-Back Camp
- Chiaki Hoshinomori (千秋), a character in the light novel series Gamers!
- Chiaki Motomiya (元宮 チアキ), a character in video game Blue Archive
- Chiaki Soga (曽我 千晃), a character in the manga series Kagurabachi
