= Rimits: Best Duet Songs =

Rmits: Best Duet Songs

Compilation album by Rimi Natsukawa
- Released: March 22, 2006
- Recorded: 2002–2006
- Genre: J-pop, Shima uta, traditional
- Length: 45:52
- Label: Victor Entertainment

Rimi Natsukawa chronology
Ayakaji no Ne (2005)	Rmits: Best Duet Songs (2006)	Rimi Natsukawa Selection (2006)

Rimits: Best Duet Songs (RIMITs ～ベスト・デュエット・ソングス～, Rimittsu Besuto Duetto Songusu) is the third compilation album released by Rimi Natsukawa on March 22, 2006. It features duets from Natsukawa's discography, and re-arrangements of her songs into duet versions.

The title is a pun on the English word "Limits" and Natsukawa's first name. A similar pun appears on the track "Hohoemi ni Shite (RiMidori Ver.)," a merge between the first names of Natsukawa and contributing duet partner, Midori Karashima.

== Song sources ==
The majority of songs are new, duet versions of tracks sung with their authors. Of these, two were pre-existing: "Nada Sōsō (Special Live Version)" was released as a single in 2003, and "Warabigami (Tida Chichi Version)," which was on her Famureuta EP in 2003.

Two songs were previously released compilation tracks. "Boku no Mune de Oyasumi," a collaboration with Chikuzen Sato (who had written "Tokotowa no Uta" from Ayakaji no Ne), was originally released on his album The Selection of Cornerstones 1995-2004 (released 2005). "Manten no Hoshi no Yoru" with Kaoru Kurosawa of The Gospellers was released on his Love Anthem album (2005). The song was written in collaboration with fellow Gospellers' member Yutaka Yasuoka.

== Track listing ==
No.	Title	Writer(s)	Arranger(s)	Length
1.	"Kana yo Kana yo (Komoriuta Version) (愛よ 愛よ～子守唄バージョン～, Love Love (Lullaby Version))" (with Kazufumi Miyazawa)	Miyazawa	Masayoshi Furukawa, Miyazawa	5:13
2.	"Warabigami (Tida Chichi Version) (童神～太陽・月バージョン～, Little God (Sun, Moon Version))" (with Misako Koja)			4:46
3.	"Manten no Hoshi no Yoru (満天の星の夜, Night with a Sky Full of Stars)" (with Kaoru Kurosawa)	Yutaka Yasuoka, Kurosawa, Takeshi Senno	K-Muto (Soysoul)	4:26
4.	"Michishirube (Kariyushi Version) (道しるべ～かりゆしバージョン～, Signpost (Good Omen Version))" (with Kiroro)	Chiharu	Kiroro	4:43
5.	"Irayoi Tsukiyohama (Kakeuta Version) (イラヨイ月夜浜～掛唄バージョン～, Treasured Moonlit Beach (Credited Version))" (with Yasukatsu Ōjima)	Ōjima, Eishō Higa	Ōjima	5:09
6.	"Hohoemi ni Shite (RiMidori Ver.) (微笑みにして～RiMidori Ver.～, Make a Smile)" (with Midori Karashima)	Karashima	Chuei Yoshikawa	4:36
7.	"Boku no Mune de Oyasumi (僕の胸でおやすみ, Goodbye with My Heart)" (with Chikuzen Sato)	Panda Yamada	Sato	3:05
8.	"Anata no Kaze (Takemi Omoto Version) (あなたの風～オモトタケミバージョン～, Your Wind (Takemi Omoto Version))" (with Begin)	Begin	Masaru Shimabukuro, Hitoshi Uechi	4:28
9.	"Famureuta (Pinoanta Version) (ファムレウタ（子守唄）～ピノアンタバージョン～, Lullaby)" (with Parsha Club)	Yukito Ara, Masaaki Uechi	Parsha Club	4:15
10.	"Nada Sōsō (Special Live Version) (涙そうそう, Great Tears Are Spilling)" (with Ryoko Moriyama, Begin)	Begin, Moriyama	Kyōda	4:22

== Japan sales rankings ==
Release	Chart	Peak position	First week sales	Sales total
March 22, 2006	Oricon Weekly Albums Chart	80	3,102	7,104
