= Chinatsu =

- Gender: Female

Origin
- Origin: Japanese
- Meaning: Different depending on the kanji

Other names
- Related names: Chiharu; Chiaki; Chiyuki

Chinatsu (ちなつ, チナツ) is a feminine Japanese given name which is occasionally given to men.

== Written forms ==
Chinatsu can be written using different kanji characters and can mean:

- 千夏, "thousand summers/thousandth summer"
- 知夏, "wise summer"
- 智夏, "intellect, summer"
- 千菜津, "thousand vegetables, harbor"
- 智菜津, "intellect, vegetable, harbor"

The name can also be written in hiragana or katakana.

== People ==
- Chinatsu Akasaki (千夏), Japanese voice actress
- Chinatsu Ban (知夏, born 1973), Japanese artist
- Chinatsu Kira (知夏, born 1991), Japanese football player
- Chinatsu Matsui (千夏, born 1977), Japanese squash player
- Chinatsu Mori (千夏, 1980–2006), Japanese shot putter
- Chinatsu Nakayama (千夏, born 1948), Japanese voice actress, writer, and politician
- Chinatsu Wakatsuki (千夏, born 1984), Japanese gravure idol and tarento

== Characters ==
- Chinatsu Aida (千夏), a supporting character in the Japanese TV drama Last Friends
- Chinatsu Aramaki (千夏), a supporting character in the manga and anime series Maid Sama!
- Chinatsu Gondo (千夏), a character in the 1994 film Godzilla vs. SpaceGodzilla
- Chinatsu Hinomiya (火宮 チナツ), a character in the role-playing video game Blue Archive
- Chinatsu Hiyama (緋山 千夏), one of the main characters in the manga and anime series ballroom e youkoso
- Chinatsu Kano (鹿野 千夏), one of the two main protagonists in the manga and anime series Blue Box
- Chinatsu Kuramoto (千夏 ), a supporting character in the manga and anime series Flying Witch
- Chinatsu Nakayama (千夏), a character in the four panel manga series Doki Doki School Hours
- Chinatsu Tsuboi (千夏), a main character in the manga and live-action drama series Shomuni
- Chinatsu Yoshikawa (ちなつ), a main character in the manga and anime series YuruYuri
