= The Public Interest =

Public policy journal (1965–2005)

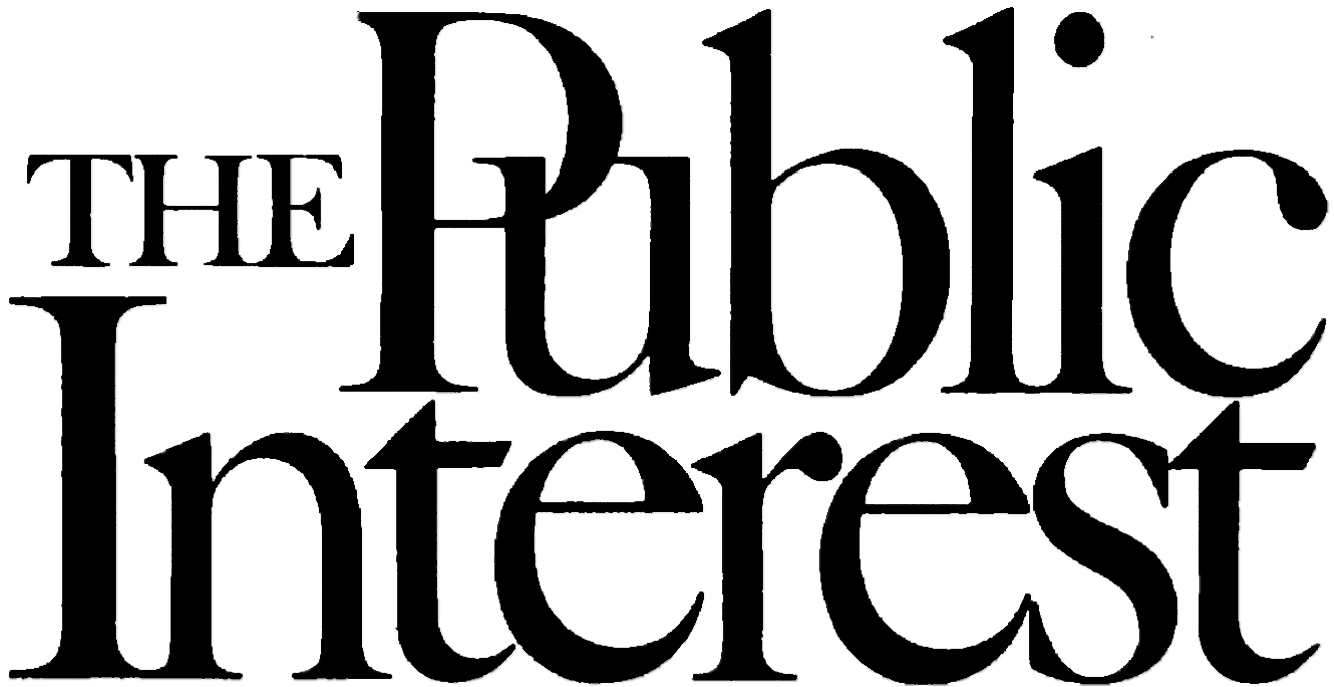
- Editor: Adam Wolfson
- Former editors: Irving Kristol
- Frequency: Quarterly
- Publisher: National Affairs, Inc.
- Founder: Daniel Bell; Irving Kristol
- Founded: 1965
- First issue: Fall 1965
- Final issue Number: Spring 2005; 159
- Country: United States
- Based in: Washington, D.C.
- Language: English
- Website: www.nationalaffairs.com/public_interest/issues/spring-2005
- ISSN: 0033-3557
- OCLC: 1642714

The Public Interest (1965–2005) was a quarterly public policy journal founded by Daniel Bell and Irving Kristol, members of the loose New York intellectuals group, in 1965. It was a leading neoconservative journal on political economy and culture, aimed at a readership of journalists, scholars and policy makers.

== Overview ==
Its content included the performance of the Great Society, the fate of social security, the character of Generation X, crime and punishment, love and courtship, the culture wars, the tax wars, the state of the underclass, and the salaries of the overclass. It eschewed foreign and defense policy.

The magazine published prominent writers and scholars including Seymour Martin Lipset, James Q. Wilson, Peter Drucker, Charles Murray, James S. Coleman, Anthony Downs, Aaron Wildavsky, Mancur Olson, Jr., Michael Novak, Samuel P. Huntington, Gertrude Himmelfarb, Martin Feldstein, Leon Kass, Irwin M. Stelzer, Daniel P. Moynihan, Nathan Glazer, Glenn C. Loury, Stephan Thernstrom, Abigail Thernstrom, Charles Krauthammer, Francis Fukuyama and David Brooks.

Editor Irving Kristol was the dominant personality, especially after Daniel Bell relocated to Harvard in 1969. Bell, troubled by what he perceived to be an excessively conservative slant, withdrew in 1973, and was replaced as co-editor by the sociologist Nathan Glazer. Kristol continued, and the magazine become known as the principal house organ of neoconservatism, a hostile label which Kristol embraced. The magazine's sub-editors were considered apprentices, and were seeded into high journalism, academia, and government staff posts. Many policies advanced by the magazine were absorbed into the mainstream of public policy.

In 1988, the journal moved its offices from New York City to Washington, D.C. With foundation support flagging, Kristol aging, and no obvious successor, The Public Interest published its final issue in the spring of 2005. Towards the end, its readership had declined significantly. Kristol wrote on the history of the journal in his article "Forty Good Years" in the final issue.

== See also ==
- National Affairs, Inc.
- Steven Lagerfeld
