= The Wilson Quarterly =

American nonpartisan magazine

- Categories: Culture, Literature, Politics, Current Events
- Frequency: Quarterly
- Circulation: 70,000
- First issue: 1976
- Final issue: Summer 2012 (print)
- Company: Woodrow Wilson International Center for Scholars
- Country: United States
- Based in: Washington, D.C.
- Language: English
- Website: wilsonquarterly.com; Official archives
- ISSN: 0363-3276
- OCLC: 743409751

The Wilson Quarterly is a magazine published by the Woodrow Wilson International Center for Scholars in Washington, D.C. The magazine was founded in 1976 by Peter Braestrup and James H. Billington. It is noted for its nonpartisan, non-ideological approach to current issues, with articles written from various perspectives. Since summer 2012 it has been published online.

== History ==
The first issue appeared in Autumn 1976 and established two of the magazine's signature features. Article "clusters" explore different facets of a subject, often with contrasting points of view. Early subjects ranged from the exploration of space to the new revisionist history of the New Deal, with writers including Walt W. Rostow, Rem Koolhaas, George F. Kennan, John Updike, Carlos Fuentes, and Mario Vargas Llosa. The magazine also includes individual essays. The Wilson Quarterly's other signature feature is its "In Essence" section, which distills more than two dozen notable articles selected from hundreds of scholarly journals and specialized publications.

The magazine has gone through various format changes over the years, and between 1983 and 1990 it was published five times a year. It is also published quarterly.

When Peter Braestrup left the magazine in 1989 to join Billington at the Library of Congress, he was succeeded by Jay Tolson, the magazine's literary editor. Tolson added a successful poetry section designed to introduce readers to significant poets of the past and present. The section was initially co-edited by Joseph Brodsky and poet laureate Anthony Hecht.

The magazine continued to focus on public questions, exemplified by the 1998 cluster "Is Everything Relative?" with articles by E. O. Wilson, Richard Rorty, and Paul R. Gross debating Wilson's claim in Consilience that all branches of knowledge will eventually be unified by a biological understanding of human life. In "The Second Coming of the American Small Town" in 1992, Andres Duany and Elizabeth Plater-Zyberk offered an early in-depth look at the New Urbanism and some of the animating ideas behind Smart Growth.

When Tolson left in 1999, Steven Lagerfeld was named editor. Lagerfeld had also worked under founding editor Peter Braestrup, joining the staff in 1981. In keeping with the times and the focus of the Woodrow Wilson Center, the magazine looked increasingly overseas, filling the period around the beginning of the Iraq War with distinctive clusters on American empire, foreign writers' views of the United States, the history of Iraq, and World War IV. Other topics have ranged from the role of competition in American life to the ideas of traffic "guru" Hans Monderman. Recent writers have spanned the spectrum from conservative economist and blogger Tyler Cowen to liberal political thinker Benjamin Barber. In 2006, The Wilson Quarterly received an Utne Reader Independent Press Award for General Excellence and in 2011 for International Coverage.

== Digital format ==
In 2012, The Wilson Quarterly changed to a digital-only publishing model. The Summer 2012 (Volume 36, No. 3) issue was the last to be printed. Existing print subscribers were not transferred to the new digital subscription model, but rather were transferred to Pacific Standard subscriptions.

In October 2014, under editor Zack Stanton, it was awarded "Best Relaunch" and "Best Overall Design" in the 2014 EPPY Awards given by Editor & Publisher magazine. Richard Solash became the publication's editor in April 2017, and in October 2017, on the strength of its Arctic-themed issue, the publication was awarded an EPPY in the category of "Best Digital Magazine" (less than 1 million monthly visitors).
