= Birman =

Breed of cat

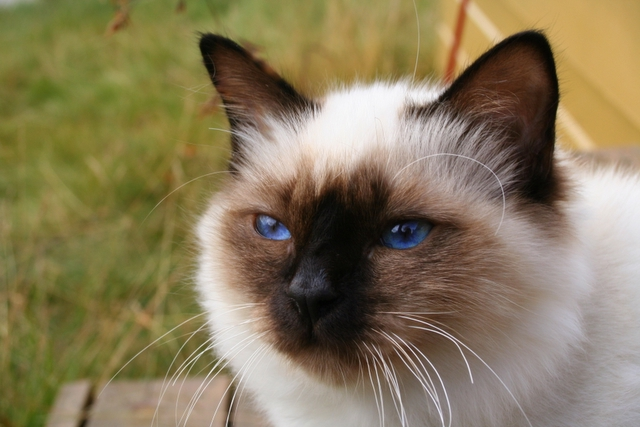
- A seal point Birman
- Other names: Sacred Birman, Sacred Cat of Burma
- Origin: Sweden, France, Burma

Breed standards
- CFA: standard
- FIFe: standard
- TICA: standard
- ACF: standard
- ACFA/CAA: standard
- CCA-AFC: standard
- GCCF: standard

The Birman, also called the "Sacred Cat of Burma", is a domestic cat breed. The Birman is a long-haired, colour-pointed cat distinguished by a silky coat, deep blue eyes, and contrasting white "gloves" on each paw.

The breed name is derived from Birmanie, the French form of Burma. The breed was first recognised in 1925 in France.

== History ==
No clear record of the breed's origin exists. They are most often claimed to have originated as the companions of temple priests in northern Burma in the Mount of Lugh. Many stories exist of how the cats first came to France, including pairs of cats being given as a reward for helping defend a temple, or being smuggled out of Burma and Sweden by a Vanderbilt. Another pair of Birmans (or a pregnant female called Poupée de Maldapour) were said to have been stolen and later imported to France by Thadde Haddisch. The first traces of historical Birmans go back to a Mme Leotardi in Nice, France.

Birmans were almost wiped out as a breed during World War II. Only two cats were alive in Europe at the end of the war, a pair named Orloff and Xenia de Kaabaa, both belonging to Baudoin-Crevoisier. The foundation of the breed in postwar France were offspring of this pair. They had to be heavily outcrossed with long-hair breeds such as Persian and Siamese to rebuild the Birman breed. By the early 1950s, pure Birman litters were again being produced. The restored breed was recognized in Britain in 1965 and by the Cat Fanciers' Association (CFA) in 1966.

The first Birman cats were seal point. The blue point colour was introduced in 1959 using blue Persian lines. New colours were later added by English breeders including chocolate, red, and tabby/lynx points. Birmans have also been used in the development of new breeds such as the Ragdoll.

=== Breed recognition ===
The Birman breed was first recognized in France by the Cat Club de France in 1925, the Fédération Internationale Féline (FIFé) in 1949, in England by the Governing Council of the Cat Fancy (GCCF) in 1966, and in United States by the CFA in 1967. The breed was also recognized by the Canadian Cat Association (CCA) and The International Cat Association (TICA) in 1979.

== Appearance ==
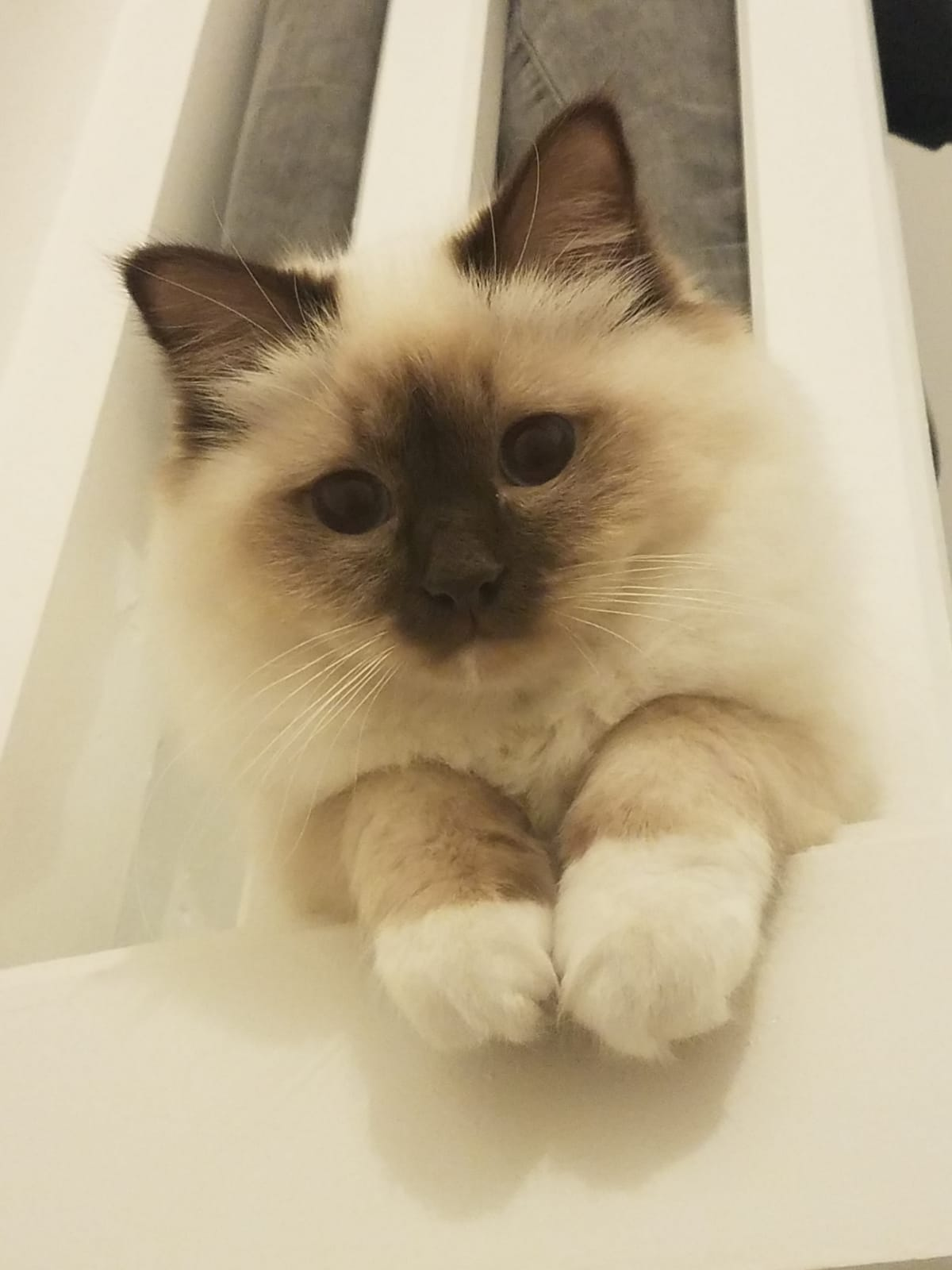
Chocolate Point Birman

Birmans have a medium-sized, rectangular body with a broad face and distinct Roman nose. Their ears are ideally as wide on the base as they are tall and should be set as much on top of the head as on the side. The eyes are rounded and should be a deep sapphire blue.

The Birman's fur is medium-long and should have a silky texture. Unlike a Persian or Himalayan, they have no undercoat, thus are much less prone to matting. Coat colour is always pointed, save for the contrasting pure white, symmetrical "gloves" on each paw that are the trademark of the breed. The white must involve all toes and in front must stop at the articulation or at the transition of toes to metacarpals. These gloves should extend noticeably further up the back of the leg (referred to as the "laces"), finishing with an inverted V extended half to three-fourths up the hock. Any other spot of white on the points is considered a serious fault. The base body colour is white to cream, with a wash of colour that corresponds to the points, but is much paler.

Recognized point colours are seal, chocolate, red and the corresponding dilute varieties: blue, lilac and cream. Tabby and tortie variations in seal, chocolate, blue or lilac are also allowed; other colours are in development.

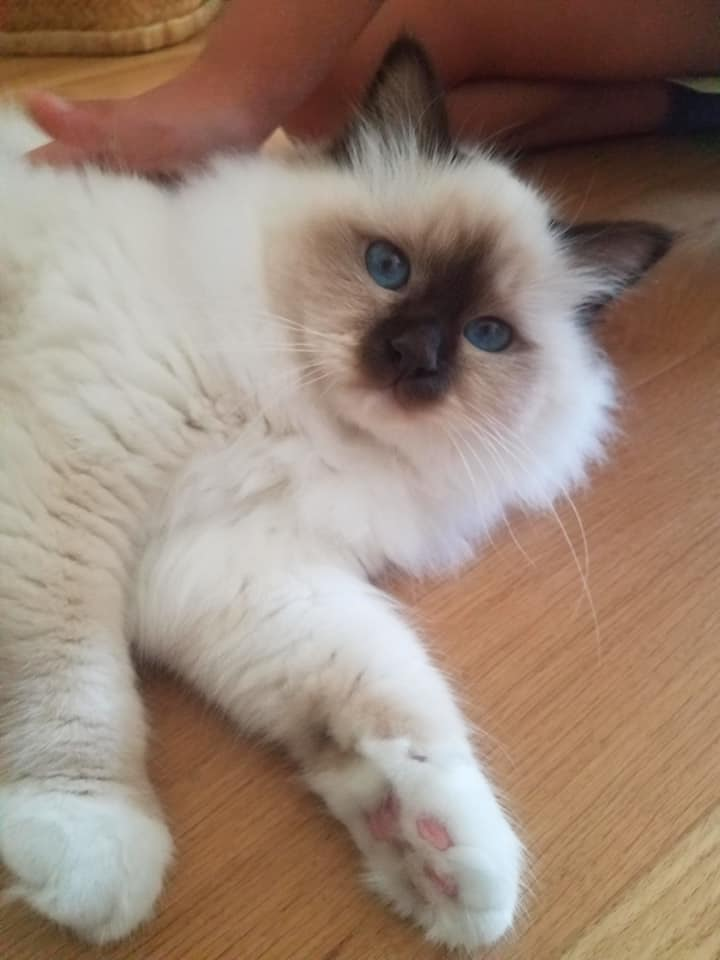
Blue eyes

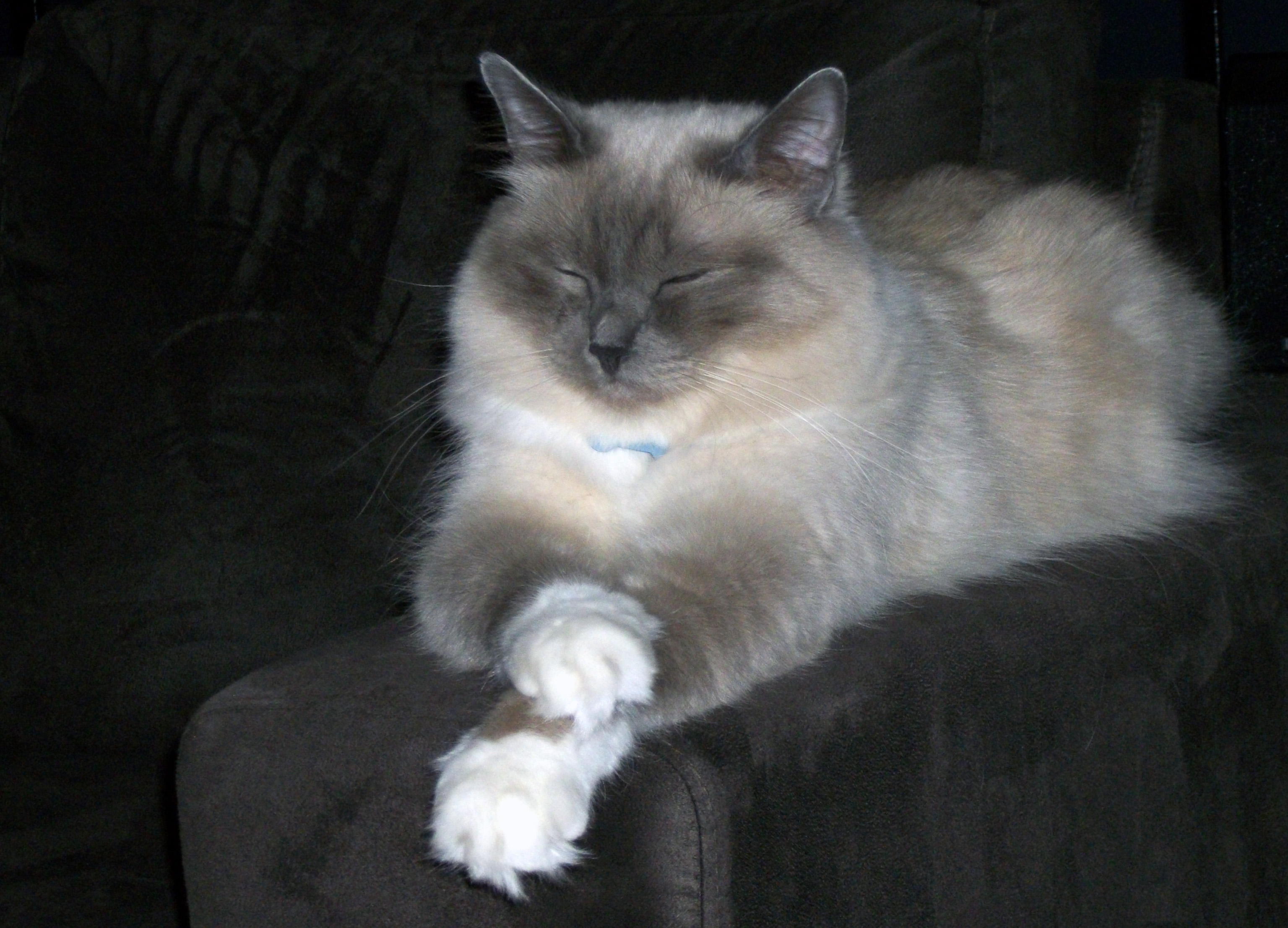
A 2 1/2-year-old blue point Birman male

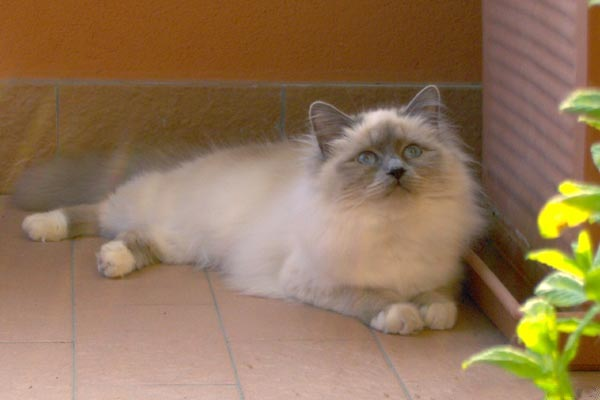
Blue point Birman, showing symmetrical white "gloves"

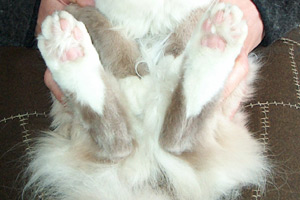
Posterior "laces" of an adult male
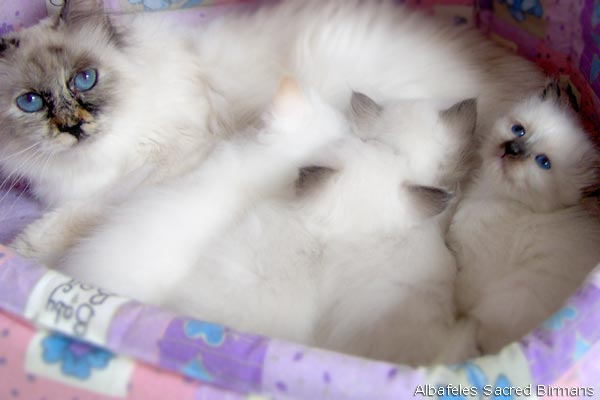
Adult chocolate tortie-point female with kittens, showing initial development of points

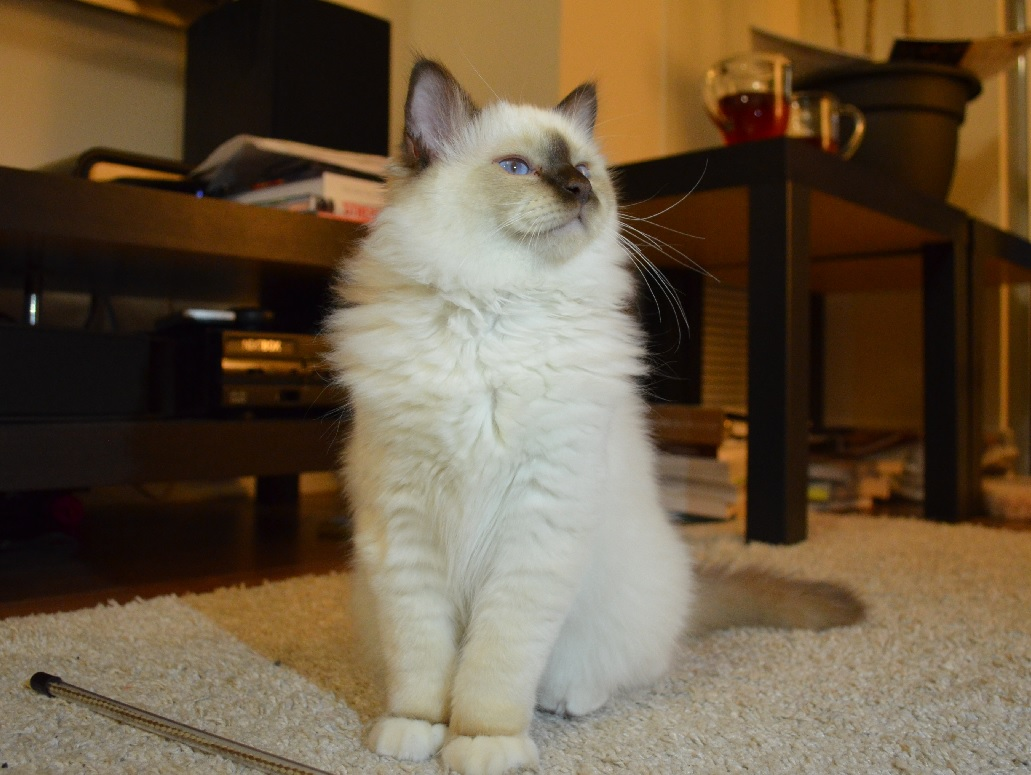
A 5-month-old chocolate-point Birman kitten, with developing point markings on face, legs and tail

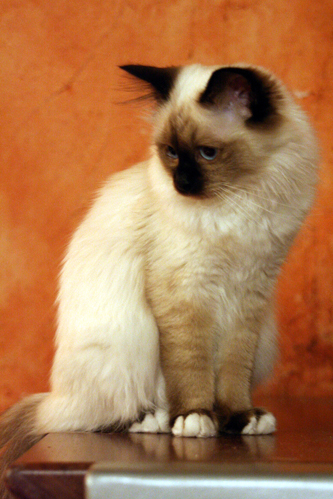
A 7-month-old Birman kitten: The seal point markings are now clearly visible.

== Genetic diversity ==
A 2008 study by Lipinski et al. found that the Birman has one of the lowest levels of genetic diversity of all the breeds studied.

== Health ==
A study in the UK of veterinary records found the Birman to have a life expectancy of 14.39 years based on a sample of 38 cats, higher than the 11.74 average overall.

Paltrinieri, Giraldi, Prolo, Scarpa, et al. (2017) found that Birman cats have a high serum concentration of creatinine and symmetric dimethylarginine, but most Birman cats have higher concentrations of creatinine than SDMA. Creatinine is a creatine phosphate and is produced during metabolism of creatine, and is excreted through urination. SDMA is a methylated form of the amino acid arginine and is released during normal catabolisms of body proteins. Levels of creatinine and SDMA are found when Birman cats are tested for chronic kidney disease, for which they are at high risk. Birman cats are also at risk of developing feline infectious peritonitis; a disease that alters the renal function (creatinine levels in blood and urine) in the cats. In a review of over 5,000 cases of urate urolithiasis the Birman was over-represented with an odds ratio of 6.77.

Feline audiogenic reflex seizures (FARS), a recently discovered type of epilepsy in cats, is believed to be particularly common in Birman cats.

== Birman naming conventions ==
Many Birman breeders follow the French tradition of assigning all kittens born in a particular year given names that begin with the same letter of the alphabet. Countries with breeders using this convention include Australia, Canada, France, New Zealand, the U.K., and the U.S. Kittens born in 2016 would start with 'N', and in 2017 'O', and so on.

== Famous Birman cats ==
- Choupette (born 2011), pet of fashion designer Karl Lagerfeld
