= Hiropon (sculpture) =

Sculpture by Takashi Murakami

- Artist: Takashi Murakami
- Year: 1997
- Medium: Sculpture (oil and acrylic on fiberglass)
- Movement: Superflat
- Dimensions: 223.5 cm × 104 cm × 122 cm (7.33 ft × 3.41 ft × 4.00 ft)

Hiropon is a sculpture created in 1997 by Japanese artist Takashi Murakami. Produced during Murakami's so-called "bodily fluids" period, the 7.33 ft (223.5 cm) tall statue depicts an anime-inspired figure expelling streams of breast milk from her nipples. Like its companion piece My Lonesome Cowboy, it is an example of superflat art, an art movement founded by Murakami in the 1990s to criticize Japanese consumer culture.

== Description ==
External image
- Hiropon at Christie's

Hiropon is an approximately seven-foot tall sculpture depicting a nude anime-inspired woman with exaggerated breasts and nipples wearing a bikini top. Her hands are clutching her nipples, which are expelling streams of breast milk that circle her body to join into a skipping rope-like shape. The sculpture is inspired by otaku culture (enthusiasts, particularly of anime and manga) and lolicon (the fetishization of young-looking girls), Murakami has stated that he was an otaku as a teenager, and that Hiropon was influenced by fantasy and erotica elements in anime and manga.

Like its companion piece My Lonesome Cowboy, Hiropon is an example of superflat art, a movement so named because of flat imagery, a lack of perspective and absence of hierarchy. The sculpture is specifically intended as a critique of the culture of post-occupation Japan, with Murakami arguing that the country's secondary status to the United States led to an infantilization of Japanese aesthetics and politics, "implod[ing] into fantasies of monsters and superheroes, galactic wars, cyborgs, and schoolgirls." The title of the sculpture references the Japanese term for methamphetamine, with Murakami depicting otaku culture as a form of similarly illicit entertainment.

== Casts ==
Murakami produced three casts plus one artist's proof of Hiropon, with the hair color and bikini top of the figure differing in each of the casts. A cast of Hiropon sold at an auction in 2002 for USD$427,500.

== Reception ==
New York Times art critic Roberta Smith wrote that both Hiropon and My Lonesome Cowboy "mesmerize through an unsettling combination of innocence, carnal knowledge, beauty, exquisite artifice and arrested movement," noting Hiropon as "especially good" compared to the "simplistically macho" My Lonesome Cowboy. She nonetheless assessed both pieces favorably, arguing "after their shock value has declined, as all shock value must, they are still interesting to look at," arguing that both pieces are more successful than the erotic sculptures of Jeff Koons and Allen Jones. Art scholar Grace McQuilten is more critical of the piece, arguing that it "was not created as a critique of the way women are represented in otaku culture. Instead, it directly appeals to the market."
