= Karl Lagerfeld =

German fashion designer (1933–2019)

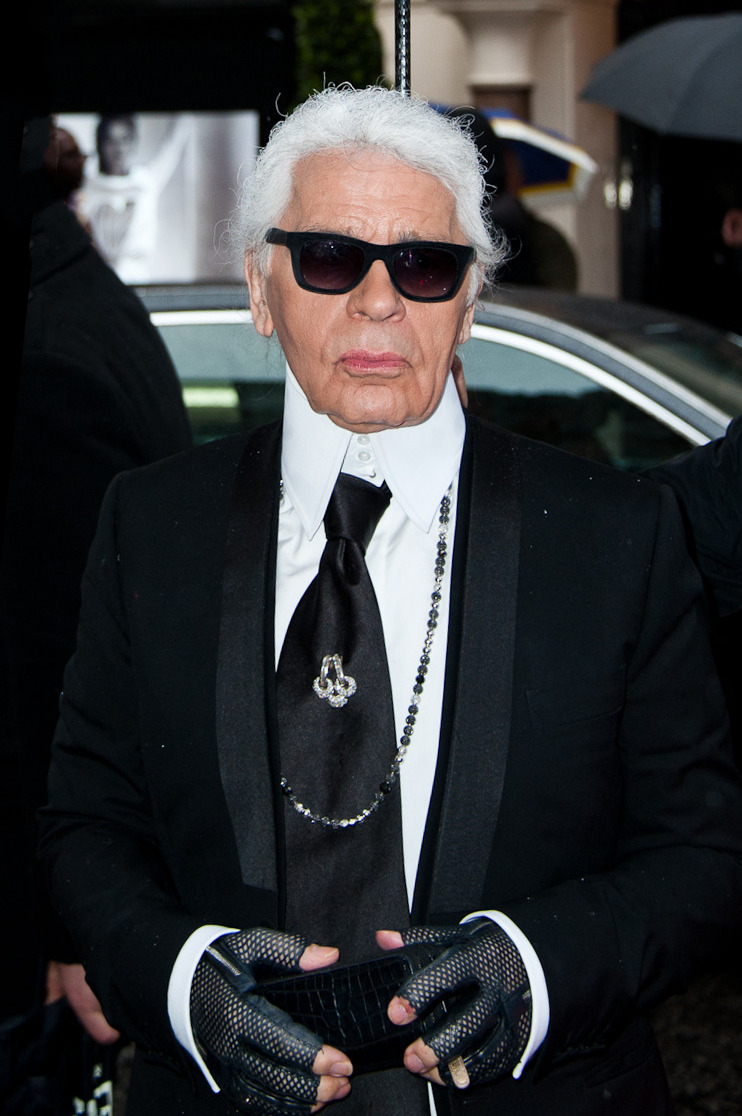
- Lagerfeld in 2014
- Born: Karl Otto Lagerfeldt; 10 September 1933; Hamburg, Germany
- Died: 19 February 2019 (aged 85); Neuilly-sur-Seine, France
- Education: Lycée Montaigne, Paris
- Occupation: Fashion designer
- Labels: Fendi (1965–2019); Chanel (1983–2019); Karl Lagerfeld (1984–2019); Other labels: Jean Patou (1958–1963); Chloé (1963–1983, 1992–1997); H&M (2004); Hogan (2011); Macy's (2011); Falabella (2017)
- Partner: Jacques de Bascher (1972–1989, his death)
- Parents: Otto Lagerfeld (father); Elisabeth Bahlmann (mother)
- Awards: Bambi Award for Creativity
- Website: www.karllagerfeld.com

Signature
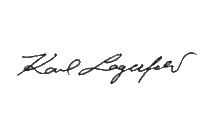

Karl Otto Lagerfeld (10 September 1933 – 19 February 2019) was a German fashion designer, photographer, and creative director.

Lagerfeld began his career in fashion in the 1950s, working for several top fashion houses including Balmain, Patou, and Chloé before joining Chanel in 1983. As the creative director of Chanel from 1983 until his death, he oversaw all aspects of the fashion house's creative output, from designing collections to photographing advertising campaigns and arranging store displays. He was instrumental in revitalising the Chanel brand, helping it regain its position as one of the top fashion houses in the world. He was also creative director of the Italian fur and leather goods fashion house Fendi, as well as his own eponymous fashion label. Throughout his career, he collaborated on numerous fashion, design, and art-related projects, and his photography was exhibited in galleries and featured in published volumes.

Lagerfeld was recognised for his signature white hair, black sunglasses, fingerless gloves, and high-starched detachable collars.

== Early life ==
Karl Otto Lagerfeld was born in Hamburg on 10 September 1933 to Elisabeth (née Bahlmann) and Otto Lagerfeld. His father, coming from a family of wealthy wine merchants, was a prosperous businessman and polyglot, speaking nine languages. He owned an import company (Lagerfeld & Co.) specialising in evaporated milk, leading him to work with the American dairy company Carnation. During his travels, his father was present during the great 1906 San Francisco earthquake, escaping unharmed. A fluent speaker of Russian, his father had attempted to obtain citizenship in the country at the start of World War I, leading to an accusation of espionage and a three-year prison term in Vladivostok, eventually returning to Germany after the Russian Revolution in 1917. Lagerfeld’s maternal grandfather, Karl Bahlmann, was a local politician for the Catholic Centre Party. His family belonged to the Old Catholic Church. When Lagerfeld's mother met his father, she was a lingerie saleswoman from Berlin. His parents married in 1930.

His older sister, Martha Christiane "Christel", was born in 1931. Lagerfeld had an older half-sister, Theodora Dorothea "Thea", from his father's first marriage. His family name has been spelled both Lagerfeldt and Lagerfeld. Like his father, he used the spelling Lagerfeld, considering it to "sound more commercial".

His family was mainly shielded from the deprivations of World War II due to his father being a member of the Nazi party and his business interests in Germany through the firm Glücksklee-Milch GmbH.

As a child, he showed great interest in the visual arts, and former schoolmates recalled he was always making sketches "no matter what we were doing in class". Lagerfeld told interviewers he learned much more by constantly visiting the Kunsthalle Hamburg museum than he did in school.

== Career ==
=== Early career, Chloé, and Fendi (1954–1982) ===
In 1954, Lagerfeld submitted a dress design to the International Wool Secretariat's design competition. His submitted entry presaged the chemise dresses which would be introduced by Givenchy and Balenciaga three years later. In 1955, Lagerfeld entered another IWS competition and won in the coat category. He also befriended another winner, Yves Saint Laurent, and was soon after hired by Pierre Balmain who was a judge for the competition. He worked as Balmain's assistant, and later apprentice, for three years.

In 1957, Lagerfeld became the artistic director for Jean Patou. He left Jean Patou in 1962, to become a freelance designer, one of the first designers to do so. In the 1960s, he freelanced for brands including Charles Jourdan, Chloé, Krizia, Valentino, and for the Rome-based fashion house Tiziani. In 1965, he was hired by Fendi to modernise their fur line. The fashion editor of The Independent, Alexander Fury, wrote in 2015 that Lagerfeld's designs for Fendi were innovative and proved groundbreaking within the industry. These included the introduction of less expensive furs such as rabbit and squirrel pelts into high fashion, and launching a ready-to-wear line. He also designed the brand's double F logo. Lagerfeld remained with Fendi Rome until his death.

In 1966, Lagerfeld became a designer for Chloé, working alongside Gaby Aghion, and in 1974 he became the sole designer for the brand. He was known in part during this period for expanding the use of crêpe de chine, a focus other designers would adopt in the 1970s, a decade when Lagerfeld's work for Chloé would make him one of the most prominent designers in the world, often vying with Yves Saint Laurent for most influential. After a period in the early seventies when he toyed with styles from the 1920s, ' 1930s, ' 1940s, and ' 1950s, in 1974 he contributed to the burgeoning Big Look or Soft Look by eliminating linings, padding, and even hemming from voluminous, thin-fabric garments, even from fur in his work for Fendi at the time, to enable an unencumbered, comfortable, layered style which would dominate the high fashion of the middle of the decade.

After refining this style and saying that to go back to linings and stiff structure would be regressive, he did a complete about-face in 1978 and joined other designers in showing the heavily constructed, huge-shouldered, more restrictive looks that would dominate the 1980s. He presented such a retro 1940s–50s silhouette – immense shoulder pads; severe, stiffly constructed suits with padded lampshade peplums; padded busts and hips; impractically tight skirts; awkwardly high spike heels; hats; gloves; even boned corsets – that his work did not look out of place alongside similar retro fare from Thierry Mugler of the period. His 50s-revival strapless, boned bodices were made more comfortable with foam padding and given the name bustier by the designer, a contribution that would become popular during the following decade.

During both these phases, his mid-seventies Soft Look phase and his late seventies-eighties big-shoulders phase, his love of the eighteenth century was frequently on display. For instance, his Fall 1977 collection, one of the most celebrated of the seventies Soft Look era, included lace trim, headwear, and thigh-high boots in styles from the 1700s, while his Fall 1979 collection, one of the most influential of the early years of the big-shoulder era, contained millinery that recalled Napoleonic bicornes, along with button-sided spats/leggings that looked somewhat like military accoutrements from the same period.

Lagerfeld continued producing outfits in the shoulder pads-tight skirts-stiletto heels direction into the eighties, joining other similar designers in shortening the skirts of the look even as high as mini length, though his hemlines could also range as low as the ankle. Alongside these styles, he also showed softer, more comfortable clothing, particularly in 1981–'82, when a brief revival of somewhat mid-seventies-looking long dirndl skirts and shawls appeared on runways and Lagerfeld touted the gossamer weightlessness he had perfected in the seventies, although he did like to place corsets and girdles over it by that time. The variety of lengths and trouser shapes he presented during this period kept him in line with modern women's needs.

=== International fame with Chanel (1982–2000) ===
Lagerfeld is credited with making great use of Chanel's "CC" logo during the 1980s.

In the 1980s, Lagerfeld was appointed by Chanel, which was considered a "near-dead brand" at the time since the death of designer Coco Chanel a decade prior. Taking over the couture there in 1983, Lagerfeld brought life back into the company, making it a huge success by revamping its ready-to-wear fashion line. Lagerfeld integrated the interlocked CC monogram of Coco Chanel into a style pattern for the House of Chanel.

Lagerfeld also changed the Chanel silhouette that had prevailed since the early 1960s, making it more eighties by padding the shoulder, shortening and tightening the skirt, raising the heel, and enlarging or miniaturising the jewellery and purses, all controversial moves, especially the short skirts, as Mlle. Chanel had always disapproved of above-the-knee skirts. This new direction was actually initiated the year before Lagerfeld took the helm, 1982, when a design team led by Hervé Léger, a Lagerfeld protegé, operated at the house. Lagerfeld is suspected of having influenced Léger's changes.

In 1984, a year after his start at Chanel, Lagerfeld began his own eponymous "Karl Lagerfeld" brand with a focus on ready-to-wear clothing. The brand was established to channel "intellectual sexiness". Lagerfeld had signed an agreement with Bidermann Industries USA, giving them ownership and licencing rights to fashion labels he produced. Lagerfeld ended the agreement with Bidermann in 1989. That same year, Lagerfeld launched two Karl Lagerfeld brand menswear lines. The Lagerfeld label was then purchased by the Cora Revillon Group, which had previously reached an agreement to manufacture and market Karl Lagerfeld-branded products.

In 1992, Dunhill Holdings—part of the Vendôme Luxury Group—acquired the Karl Lagerfeld brand from Cora-Revillon for an estimated $30 million. The acquisition was part of the agreement the company made with Lagerfeld for him to return to designing for the fashion house Chloé. Vendôme retained ownership of the brand for five years, until 1997, when it sold the brand back to Lagerfeld for a "symbolic one franc", following the end of his contract with Chloé. Lagerfeld stated that Vendôme "had not hired the right people to manage it."

Lagerfeld flourished in the plethora of historical revivals of the eighties, from the shoulder-padded 1940s–50s revivals beginning in 1978 and continuing through the eighties, to the 1950s pouf skirts, 1860s crinolines, and hoops of the mid-eighties, now often showgirl-short. Lagerfeld participated in it all, for both his namesake line and Chanel. In 1986, he marked the move away from broad shoulders by removing pads from the shoulders and placing them visibly on the outside of the hips.

=== Later career (2001–2019) ===
==== Fashion ====
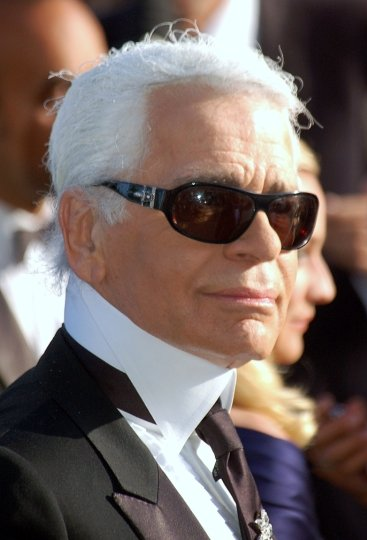
Lagerfeld at the 2007 Cannes Film Festival

In December 2006, Lagerfeld announced the launch of a new collection for men and women dubbed K Karl Lagerfeld, which included fitted T-shirts and a wide range of jeans. In September 2010, the Couture Council of The Museum at the Fashion Institute of Technology presented Lagerfeld with an award created for him, The Couture Council Fashion Visionary Award, at a benefit luncheon at Avery Fisher Hall, in New York City. In November 2010, Lagerfeld and Swedish crystal manufacturer Orrefors announced a collaboration to design a crystal art collection. The first collection was launched in spring 2011, called Orrefors by Karl Lagerfeld.

In 2012 Lagerfeld released his photo-book The Little Black Jacket which featured entertainers, models, and friends of his. In 2014, Palm Beach Modern Auctions announced that many of Lagerfeld's early sketches for the House of Tiziani in Rome would be sold.

Because his designs changed depending on which fashion house he was working for, designers such as Anna Sui and Clare Waight Keller praised his "chameleon-like versatility". In November 2015, Karl Lagerfeld was presented with the Outstanding Achievement Award at the British Fashion Awards. Anna Wintour, Editor in Chief of American Vogue, presented the award.

==== Collaborations ====
Karl Lagerfeld was well known for his collaborations with brands and individuals. Some of his notable collaborations during the 2000s and 2010s include the following:

- In 2002, Lagerfeld asked Renzo Rosso, the founder of Diesel, to collaborate with him on a special denim collection for the Lagerfeld Gallery brand. The collection, Lagerfeld Gallery by Diesel, was designed by Lagerfeld and produced by Diesel and then sold in highly limited editions at the Lagerfeld Galleries in Paris and Monaco and at the Diesel Denim Galleries in New York and Tokyo.
- In 2004, Lagerfeld designed a capsule collection for Swedish fashion chain H&M, marking the first time a designer had collaborated with the brand. Women's Wear Daily wrote that the collaboration "had a seismic effect on the entire fashion system: breaking down barriers between luxury and mass; democratising design in a new way, and foreshadowing an era of rampant collaborations, drops and pop-up concepts."
- In 2010, Lagerfeld collaborated with Coca-Cola on a limited-edition collection of Coca-Cola Light bottles in France. Lagerfeld also shot an ad campaign for the company featuring Coco Rocha and Baptiste Giabiconi. The redesigned bottles featured a vivid pink cap and a black graphic of Lagerfeld's silhouette. Coca-Cola released another set of Lagerfeld-designed bottles in 2011.
- In 2012, Lagerfeld collaborated with Japanese cosmetics brand Shu Uemura on a holiday makeup collection. Lagerfeld worked closely with the brand's shu artistic director, Kakuyasu Uchiide, to develop the line.
- In 2014, Lagerfeld collaborated with Mattel on a "Barbie Lagerfeld" doll that included fingerless gloves and a tailored black jacket.
- In 2016, Lagerfeld collaborated with Faber-Castell on the "Karlbox", a collection of fine artist tools.
- In 2017, Lagerfeld collaborated with the shoe brand Vans on a collection that included sneakers, jackets, hats, and backpacks. The next year he created a similar capsule collection for Puma. The line included Suede sneakers inspired by Lagerfeld's personal style.
- Lagerfeld was a collector of Christofle silverware, and in 2018 he collaborated with the brand on a limited-edition cutlery set. Lagerfeld had previously collaborated on a collection of crystal glasses with Orrefors.

==== Awards ====
In September 2010, the Couture Council of The Museum at the Fashion Institute of Technology presented Lagerfeld with an award created for him, The Couture Council Fashion Visionary Award, at a benefit luncheon at Avery Fisher Hall, in New York City. He received the 1993 Lucky Strike Designer Award. In November 2015, Karl Lagerfeld was presented with the Outstanding Achievement Award at the British Fashion Awards. Anna Wintour, Editor in Chief of American Vogue, presented the award. In 2017 he received the John B. Fairchild Award from WWD.

=== Final collection ===
The final Chanel collection completed before his death had an Alpine theme of après-ski clothing. As Lagerfeld requested not to have any type of funeral, the show only included a moment of silence in his honour and chairs emblazoned with his image next to Coco Chanel with the saying "the beat goes on". Although Lagerfeld shunned any emotional reactions around the idea of his death, some models could be seen crying on the runway, as well as audience members.

=== Other media ===
Lagerfeld took up photography in 1987 after being frustrated with images done for Chanel press kits. Chanel's then-image director, Éric Pfrunder, encouraged Lagerfeld to redo them himself, and photography became one of the passions of Lagerfeld's life outside of design. He went on to shoot commercial fashion campaigns, editorial shots for magazines like Harper's Bazaar, as well as architectural and landscape work. "I'm an illustrator with a camera", Lagerfeld told Women's Wear Daily at a 2010 exhibition of his work at the Maison européenne de la photographie.

In 1994, German publishing house Steidl published Off the Record, a collection of Lagerfeld's photography. The publishing house went on to release dozens of collections of his work, including The Little Black Jacket in 2012, which featured 113 portraits of models and entertainers wearing the book's eponymous article, and Karl Lagerfeld: Casa Malaparte in 2015, which documented the Italian Modernist architectural monument.

Lagerfeld and investments enterprise Dubai Infinity Holdings (DIH) signed a deal to design limited edition homes on the island of Isla Moda. A feature-length documentary film on the designer, Lagerfeld Confidential, was made by Rodolphe Marconi in 2007. Later that year, Lagerfeld assumed the role of the host of the fictional radio station K109 in the video game Grand Theft Auto IV and its DLCs The Lost & Damned and The Ballad of Gay Tony.

In 2008, he created a teddy bear in his likeness that was produced by Steiff in an edition of 2,500 that sold for $1,500. and has been immortalised in many forms, which include pins, shirts, dolls, and more. In 2009, Tra Tutti began selling Karl Lagermouse and Karl Lagerfelt, which are mini-Lagerfelds in the forms of mice and finger puppets, respectively. That same year, he had a guest voice role in the French animated film Totally Spies! The Movie.

In 1996, the Zürich-based Galerie Gmurzynska began exhibiting Lagerfeld's photography. In 1999, Lagerfeld opened 7L, a bookshop in Paris that specialises in photography collections and visual arts books. In 2000, he launched a publishing imprint, Editions 7L, in collaboration with Steidl. The imprint released books on fashion and photography and also republished rare and out-of-print books. The 7L bookshop was reconceptualised after Lagerfeld's death as a space for cultural events.

In 2010, the Maison Européenne de la Photographie assembled the largest-ever exhibit of Lagerfeld's photography. The show featured selections from his commercial work for Chanel, his celebrity portraits for Vogue and other magazines, and his more abstract landscapes and architectural pieces, including a 2007 series titled "Another Side of Versailles."

Later in life, Lagerfeld realised one of his boyhood ambitions by becoming a professional caricaturist; from 2013, his political cartoons were regularly published in the German newspaper Frankfurter Allgemeine Zeitung.

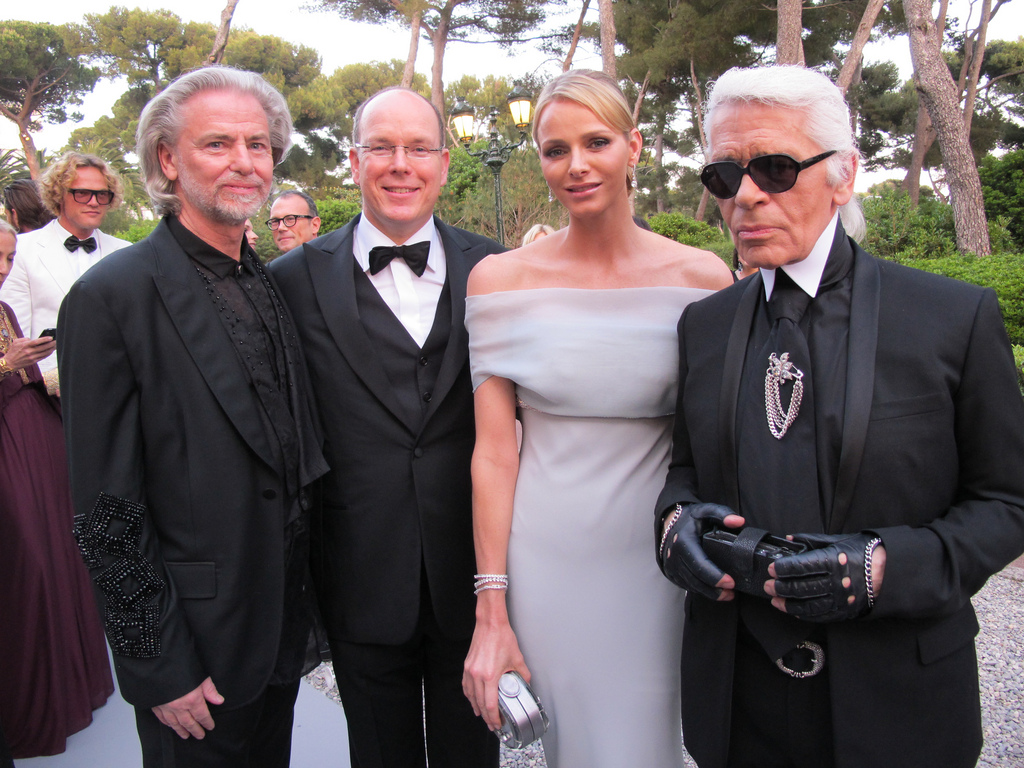
Lagerfeld with Hermann Bühlbecker, Prince Albert II and Charlene, Princess of Monaco (2011)

In 2013, he directed Once Upon a Time..., a short film starring Keira Knightley as Coco Chanel and Clotilde Hesme as her aunt, Adrienne. In June 2016, it was announced that Lagerfeld would design the two residential lobbies of the Estates at Acqualina, a residential development in Miami's Sunny Isles Beach.

In 2016, Palazzo Pitti hosted another exhibition of Karl Lagerfeld's photography that included portraits and photos from fashion shoots, all inspired by classical mythology.

In October 2018, Lagerfeld in collaboration with Carpenters Workshop Gallery launched an art collection of functional sculptures titled Architectures. Sculptures were made of Arabescato Fantastico, a rare vibrant white marble with dark grey veins and black Nero Marquina marble with milky veins. Inspired by antiquity and referred to as modern mythology the ensemble consists of gueridons, tables, lamps, consoles, fountains and mirrors.

In 2019, following the news of Lagerfeld's death, Galerie Gmurzynska mounted a retrospective exhibition highlighting the past three decades of his work.

== Death ==
After health complications in January 2019, Lagerfeld was admitted to the American Hospital of Paris in Parisian suburb Neuilly-sur-Seine on 18 February. He died there the following morning from complications of prostate cancer. He had requested no formal funeral, with plans for cremation and ashes spread at secret locations alongside his mother as well as his late partner, Jacques de Bascher.

Lagerfeld was memorialised on 20 June 2019 at the Grand Palais with "Karl For Ever", a celebration of the designer's life, which featured a career retrospective highlighting his tenures at Chloé, Fendi, and Chanel, along with his work for his eponymous Karl Lagerfeld brand. The 90-minute tribute was attended by 2,500 guests. Nearly 60 gigantic portraits were on view within the pavilion, which has hosted many Chanel runway collections. The ceremony also included readings and musical performances by Tilda Swinton, Cara Delevingne, Helen Mirren, Pharrell Williams, and Lang Lang. The production was staged by theatre and opera director Robert Carsen.

The exhibition "Lagerfeld: The Chanel Shows" of Simon Procter was shown in London, Paris, Dubai, Boca Raton and Miami.

In February 2020, Eden Gallery honoured Lagerfeld with an exhibition which explored sculptures and paintings inspired by his work.

== Personal life ==
Lagerfeld was recognised for his signature white hair, black sunglasses, fingerless gloves, and high, starched detachable collars.

In 1972, Lagerfeld began a relationship with French aristocrat and socialite Jacques de Bascher, though he maintained that it was never sexual. "I infinitely loved that boy", Lagerfeld said of de Bascher, "but I had no physical contact with him. Of course, I was seduced by his physical charm". When de Bascher had an affair with the couturier Yves Saint Laurent, Saint Laurent's business partner and former lover Pierre Bergé accused Lagerfeld of being behind a gambit to destabilise the rival fashion house. Jacques de Bascher died of AIDS in 1989, with Lagerfeld remaining at his bedside throughout the final stages of his illness. After Lagerfeld's death, tabloids reported that he was to be cremated and his ashes mixed with those of de Bascher, which Lagerfeld kept in an urn, or with those of his mother.

Lagerfeld lived in numerous homes over the years: an apartment in the Rue de l'Université in Paris, decorated in the Art Deco style (1970s); the 18th-century Chateau de Penhoët in Brittany, decorated in the Rococo style (1970s to 2000); an apartment in Monte Carlo decorated until 2000 in 1980s Memphis style (from the early 1980s); the Villa Jako in Blankenese in Hamburg, decorated in the Art Deco style (mid-1990s to 2000); the Villa La Vigie in France (the 1990s to 2000), a 17th-century mansion (hôtel particulier) in the Rue de l'Université in Paris, decorated in the Rococo and other styles (1980s to the 2000s); an apartment in Manhattan, although he never moved into or decorated it (2006 to 2012); the summer villa El Horria in Biarritz, decorated in the modern style (1990s–2006); and a house dating from the 1840s in Vermont (from the 2000s). From 2007, Lagerfeld owned an 1820s house in Paris in Quai Voltaire decorated in modern and Art Deco style.

A spread with pictures inside Lagerfeld's apartments in Paris and Monaco was published in Vogue. He also revealed his vast collection of Suzanne Belperron's pins and brooches. He used the colour of one of her blue chalcedony rings as the starting point for the Chanel spring/summer 2012 collection.

Lagerfeld owned a red point Birman cat named Choupette, which, in June 2013, he indicated he would marry, if it were legal. According to reports, the designer included the feline in his will from 2015, and bequeathed US$1.5 million dollars for its care and maintenance.

=== Weight loss ===
Lagerfeld lost 42 kg (93 lb) in 2001. He explained: "I suddenly wanted to dress differently, to wear clothes designed by Hedi Slimane. ... But these fashions, modeled by very, very slim boys—and not men my age—required me to lose at least 40 kg. It took me exactly 13 months". The diet was created specially for him by Jean-Claude Houdret, which led to a book called The Karl Lagerfeld Diet. He promoted it on Larry King Live and other television shows.

=== Book collecting ===
Lagerfeld was a passionate book collector and amassed one of the largest personal libraries in the world. According to the Rare Book Hub, he was quoted as saying: "Today, I only collect books; there is no room left for something else. If you go to my house, I'll have you walk around the books. I ended up with a library of 300,000. It's a lot for an individual".

=== Death, tributes, and retrospectives ===
==== The White Shirt Project ====
In July 2019, the house of Karl Lagerfeld announced the development of "The White Shirt Project". In homage to its eponymous founder, the project celebrated the late designer's legacy with a collection of reimagined, iconic white shirts.

Lagerfeld once said: "If you ask me what I'd most like to have invented in fashion, I'd say the white shirt. For me, the white shirt is the basis of everything. Everything else comes after."

The global project was curated by Karl Lagerfeld's then Style Advisor Carine Roitfeld and featured designs from Cara Delevingne, Kate Moss, Tommy Hilfiger, Diane Kruger, Takashi Murakami, Amber Valletta, and British street artist Endless, amongst others. A White Shirt tribute event at Paris Fashion Week featured Anna Wintour, Kaia Gerber, and Karlie Kloss.

Seven was Lagerfeld's favourite number, and as such, seven of the final designs were replicated 77 times and sold for €777 each, with proceeds benefiting a French charity affiliated with Paris Descartes University.

==== Metropolitan Museum of Art 2023 Costume Institute Exhibition and Met Gala ====
The Metropolitan Museum of Art honoured the designer with a retrospective of his work with Balmain, Patou, Chloe, Fendi, Chanel, and his eponymous line. The posthumous exhibition, Karl Lagerfeld: A Line of Beauty spanned Lagerfeld's six-decade career and included more than 150 objects.

Chanel, Fendi, Condé Nast, and Lagerfeld's own fashion brand provided support for the exhibition and the accompanying 2023 Met Gala. The 2023 fête was co-chaired by Michaela Coel, Penélope Cruz, Roger Federer, Dua Lipa, and Condé Nast Global Chief Content Officer, Anna Wintour. Pritzker Prize-winning architect Tadao Ando designed the exhibit. Curator Andrew Bolton expounded on the exhibition's inspiration in the April 2023 issue of Architectural Digest. Bolton explained that the tribute would focus largely on Lagerfeld's design process, specifically his sketches, and would showcase both the literal lines of Lagerfeld's drawings as well as the sartorial lines or silhouettes of his works.

== Controversies ==
There was much controversy from Lagerfeld's use of a verse from the Quran on three dresses in his spring 1994 couture collection for Chanel, he went on to issue a public apology, and ordered all three dresses to be destroyed via burning. The controversy erupted after the 1994 couture show in Paris when the Indonesian Muslim Scholars Council in Jakarta called for a boycott of Chanel and threatened to file formal protests with the government of Lagerfeld's homeland, Germany. The designer went on to explain that he had taken the design from a book about the Taj Mahal, thinking the words came from a love poem.

Lagerfeld was a supporter of the use of fur in fashion, although he did not wear fur and hardly ate meat. In a BBC interview in 2009, he claimed that hunters "make a living having learnt nothing else than hunting, killing those beasts who would kill us if they could" and said: "In a meat-eating world, wearing leather for shoes and clothes and even handbags, the discussion of fur is childish". Spokespersons for People for the Ethical Treatment of Animals (PETA) called Lagerfeld "a fashion dinosaur who is as out of step as his furs are out of style", and "particularly delusional with his kill-or-be-killed mentality. When was the last time a person's life was threatened by a mink or rabbit?" In 2001, he was the target of a pieing at a fashion premiere at Lincoln Center in New York City. However, the tofu pies hurled by animal rights activists in protest against his use of fur within his collections went astray, instead hitting Calvin Klein. A PETA spokesperson described the hit on Klein as "friendly fire", calling Klein, who does not use fur, "a great friend to the animals" and Lagerfeld a "designer dinosaur", who continues to use fur in his collections. In 2010, after Lagerfeld used fake fur in his 2010 Chanel collection, PETA's website claimed: "It's the triumph of fake fur ... because fake fur changed so much and became so great now that you can hardly see a difference".

Lagerfeld in 2009 joined critics of supermodel Heidi Klum, following German designer Wolfgang Joop's remarks about Klum, who had posed naked on the cover of the German edition of GQ magazine. Joop described Klum as being "no runway model. She is simply too heavy and has too big a bust". Lagerfeld commented that neither he nor Claudia Schiffer knew Klum, as she had never worked in Paris, and that she was insignificant in the world of high fashion, being "more bling bling and glamorous than current fashion". He created an international furore on 9 February 2012, when he called the singer Adele "a little too fat". Adele responded that she is like the majority of women, and she is very proud of that. Lagerfeld later caused another controversy, on 31 July 2012, when he criticised Pippa Middleton, the sister of Catherine, Princess of Wales, for her looks.

His caricature drawing Harvey Schweinstein, that shows film producer Harvey Weinstein as a pig, was criticised as antisemitic and dehumanising. He sparked controversy by criticising German Chancellor Angela Merkel's immigration policy during the European migrant crisis by saying, "You cannot kill millions of Jews and then take in millions of their worst enemies afterwards, even if there are decades [between the events]", and by accusing her to have thereby caused the rise of the party Alternative for Germany (AfD). In May 2018, during an interview with French newspaper Le Point, Lagerfeld mentioned that he was contemplating giving up his German citizenship due to the one million Muslim immigrants that had been accepted into Germany by Merkel, a decision to which he attributed the increase in neo-Nazism in the country.

In a 2019 interview with French magazine Numéro, Lagerfeld dismissed the #MeToo movement and stated, "If you don't want your pants pulled about, don't become a model. Join a nunnery, there'll always be a place for you in the convent". He also criticised newly instated regulations in photo studios and modelling agencies enacted to protect young models, stating that they were "too much" and as a designer, "you can't do anything". Lagerfeld also defended stylist Karl Templer, who was accused of sexual misconduct and stated that although he could not stand Harvey Weinstein, his distaste for him was of a professional nature.

Lagerfeld said in 2007 that his controversial persona was an act.
