= Choupette =

Pet cat of Karl Lagerfeld

Choupette Lagerfeld
- Species: Felis catus
- Breed: Birman
- Sex: Female
- Born: 15 August 2011 (age 15)
- Owner: Karl Lagerfeld (2011–2019) (his death)

Choupette (born 15 August 2011) is a blue-cream Birman cat who was the pet of German fashion designer Karl Lagerfeld from around Christmas 2011, until Lagerfeld's death on 19 February 2019 at the age of 85.

== History ==
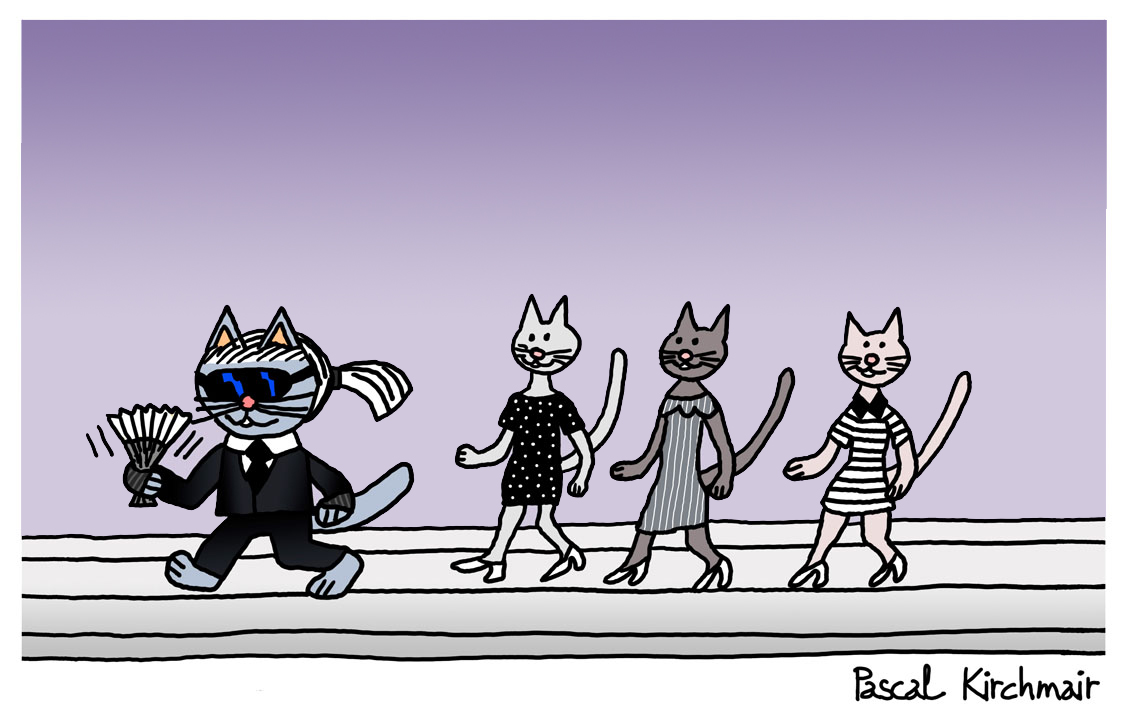
Karl Lagerfeld & Choupette

Originally belonging to the French model Baptiste Giabiconi, Choupette was given to Lagerfeld as a gift around Christmas 2011, following a stay with the designer while Giabiconi was abroad.

Lagerfeld remarked "People are stunned by her ... Soon people will talk more about Choupette than about me!"

Following Lagerfeld's death in February 2019, speculation ran rampant that the feline would inherit part of the late designer's fortune, as Lagerfeld once told Le Figaro that (Choupette) "has her own little fortune. She is an heiress”.

== Use in fashion and cat supplies ==
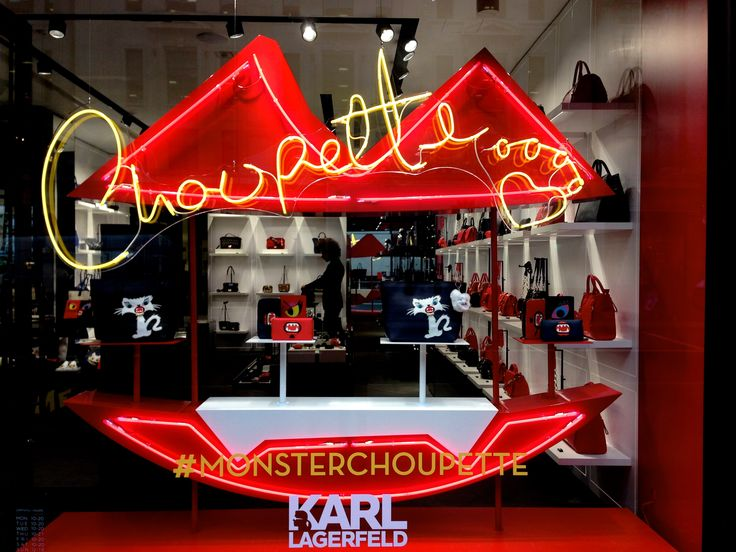
Karl Lagerfeld store window on Regent Street, London

Internet rumours of a Choupette-inspired Chanel handbag first appeared in early July 2012 following a tweet by the New York Times' Cathy Horyn. It was speculated that the Choupette was the bag carried by models in Lagerfeld's Fall 2012 Couture show, though this was never confirmed.

Choupette has been credited as the inspiration behind Lagerfeld's cornflower blue Spring 2012 Couture collection.

As of July 2014, a book, Choupette, was slated for release, as was a capsule makeup collection by Shu Uemura.

In March 2015, Lagerfeld said, in an interview with The Cut, that Choupette had earned €3 million ($3.18 million USD) during 2014 from participating in two projects: one for cars in Germany, and the other for a Shu Uemura's "Shupette" beauty product in Japan.

In 2020, "Choupette" announced a cooperation with LucyBalu, a German cat furniture and cat supplies company.

Actor Jared Leto wore a full-sized cat costume designed to look like Choupette at the 2023 Met Gala.

Choupette provided the mewing of Azrael, Gargamel's cat, in the French dub of the 2025 film Smurfs.

== See also ==
- List of individual cats
- List of wealthiest animals
