= Little Boy: The Arts of Japan's Exploding Subculture =

Book by Takashi Murakami

- Author: Takashi Murakami
- Subject: Contemporary art, Japanese popular culture
- Publisher: Yale University Press
- Publication date: 2005
- Publication place: United States of America
- Pages: 298
- ISBN: 978-0-913304-57-0
- OCLC: 58998868

Little Boy: The Arts of Japan's Exploding Subculture is the companion catalogue to the exhibition "Little Boy" curated by artist Takashi Murakami. The book is about the aesthetics of postwar culture in Japan and marks the final project of Murakami's Superflat Trilogy started in 2000.

The 298 pages hardcover book was published by Yale University in conjunction with a series of art exhibitions and music events in the Japan Society of New York in 2005. The book interprets the complex intuitive twist of postwar Japanese art while defining its high-spirited and naturally buoyant escape from human tragedy and the events of World War II. Apart from Murakami, who authored three texts and interviewed Toshio Okada and Kaichiro Morikawa, other authors are Noi Sawaragi, Midori Matsui, Alexandra Munroe, Tom Eccles, and Katy Siegel.

Takashi Murakami coined the term superflat to argue for the two-dimensional sensibility and specific visual aspects of manga (comics), anime (animated television and cinema), and earlier Japanese art such as ukiyo-e, in conjunction to contemporary, "Neo-pop" artists from Japan. He argues how the recent international boom in consumer pop media culture influenced Japanese fine art where hierarchies between high and low art, fine art and popular culture, culture and subculture, were abolished, or flattened. He also acknowledges the cultural impact of the atomic bombings of Hiroshima and Nagasaki (Little Boy is the code name for one of the atomic bombs) and the U.S. occupation as leading factors in the post-WWII traumas, including the infantilization of Japan as a society, which all found their way in popular culture such as manga and anime.

Little Boy also examines Kawaii, the culture of cuteness which has influenced Japanese popular culture since the 1970s, and the subculture of Otaku, fans of popular culture and/or outcasts. The book contains a collection of works by contemporary artists, but also anime and manga (DAICON IV, Time Bokan, Doraemon, Akira, Space Battleship Yamato, Mobile Suit Gundam, Neon Genesis Evangelion), film (Godzilla, Ultraman/Ultraseven, Toho Tokusatsu films), toys, characters (Hello Kitty, Yuru-chara yurui characters), historical photography (Hiroshima bombing), and Japanese Article 9.

== Japan Society Exhibit ==
Little Boy exhibition was presented at Japan Society in conjunction with the Public Art Fund between April 8 to July 24, 2005 in New York. The exhibition consisted of four public art projects that explored the phenomenon otaku, a subculture consisting of science fiction, manga and anime.

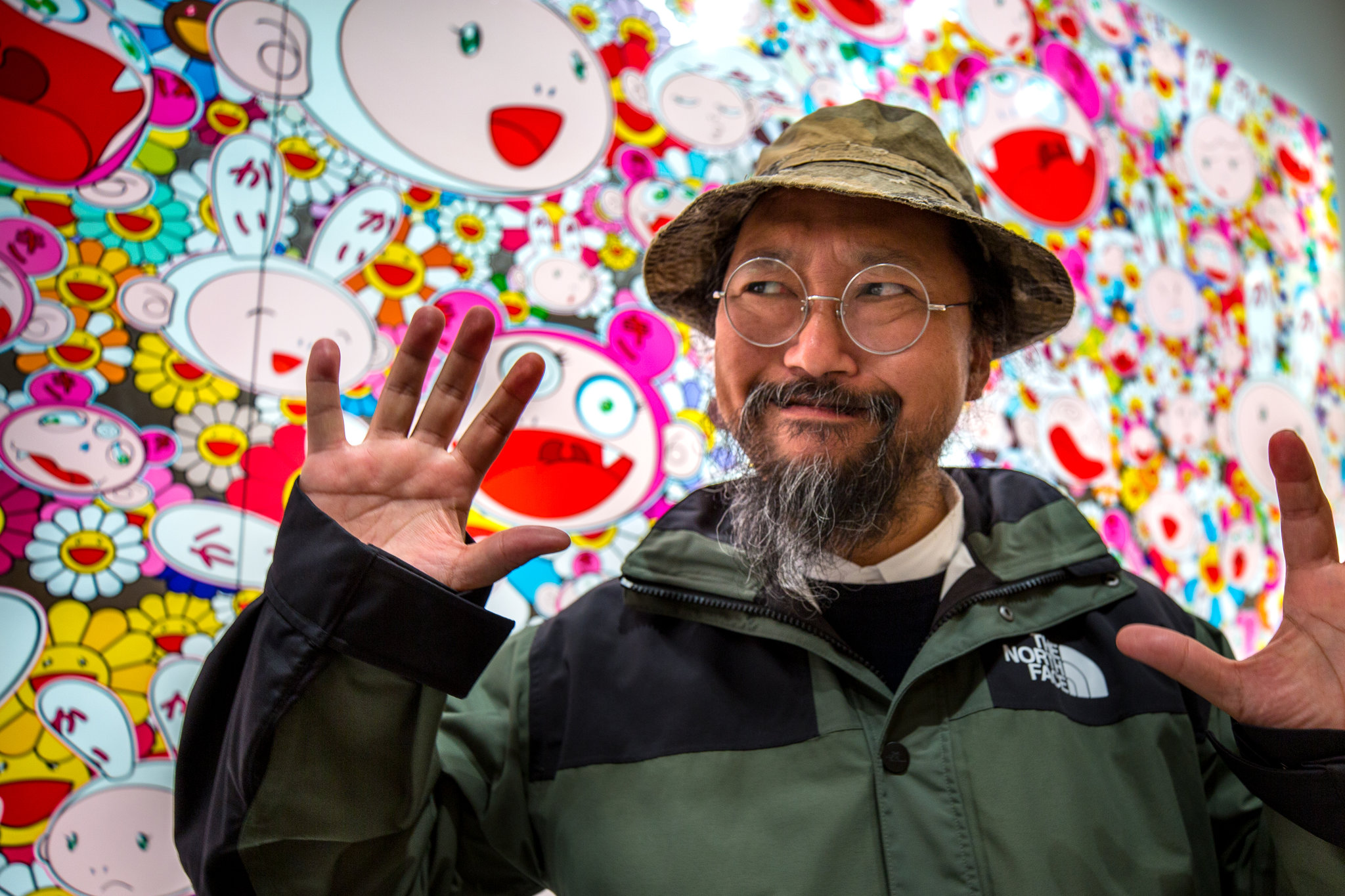
Takashi Murakami, exhibition "Lineage of Eccentrics," a collaboration with Nobuo Tsuji and the Museum of Fine Arts, Boston, 2017.

Curated by Murakami, this exhibition explored the culture of postwar Japan through the art and visual media from Hideaki Anno, Chiho Aoshima, Chinatsu Ban, Fujiko Fujio, Kawashima Hideaki, Kato Izumi, Komatsuzaki Shigeru, Mahomi Kunikata, Leiji Matsumoto, Miura Jun, Mr., Narita Toru, Tarō Okamoto, Ohshima Yuki, Katsuhiro Ōtomo, Otomo Shoji, Aya Takano, Tsubaki Noboru, Kenji Yanobe, Yoshitomo Nara and Takashi Murakami.
