= Lagerfelt =

Lagerfelt is a surname. Notable people with the surname include:

- Caroline Lagerfelt (born 1947), American actress
- Karl-Gustav Lagerfelt (1909–1986), Swedish diplomat

== See also ==
- Lagerfeld
