= Chiharu =

- Gender: Female

Origin
- Origin: Japanese
- Meaning: Different depending on the kanji

Other names
- Related names: Chinatsu; Chiaki

Chiharu (ちはる, チハル) is a feminine Japanese given name which is occasionally used by men.

== Written forms ==
Chiharu can be written using different kanji characters and can mean:

- 千春, "thousand, spring"
- 千晴, "thousand, sunny weather"
- 知春, "wisdom, spring"

The name can also be written in hiragana or katakana.

== People with the name ==
- Chiharu Araki (千陽, born 1982), Japanese politician
- Chiharu Icho (千春, born 1981), Japanese wrestler
- Chiharu Igaya (千春, born 1931), Japanese Olympic alpine skier
- Chiharu Kato (加藤 智陽, born 1996), Japanese footballer
- Chiharu Kawai (千春, born 1973), Japanese actress, model, and voice actress
- Chiharu Kitaoka (千陽, born 1988), Japanese voice actress
- Chiharu Matsuyama (千春, born 1955), Japanese singer-songwriter
- Chiharu Mori (森 千春; born 1962), Japanese swimmer
- Chiharu Muto (武藤 千春; born 1995), Japanese businesswoman and singer
- Chiharu Nakamura (知春, born 1988), Japanese rugby sevens player
- Chiharu Niiyama (千春), a Japanese actress and gravure idol
- Chiharu Nozaki (野崎 千春; born 1973), Japanese speed skater
- Chiharu Ogiwara (荻原 千春; born 1957), Japanese male boxer
- Chiharu Saiguchi (千晴, born 1938), Justice of the Supreme Court of Japan
- Chiharu Sawashiro (沢城 千春; born 1987), Japanese voice actor
- Chiharu Shida (志田 千陽; born 1997), Japanese badminton player
- Chiharu Shiota (塩田 千春; born 1972), Japanese performance and installation artist
- Chiharu Suzuka (千春, born 1958), Japanese voice actress
- Chiharu Tezuka (ちはる, born 1974), Japanese voice actress
- Chiharu Ohno (おおの ちはる, born April 12, 1979), Japanese ring announcer and former professional wrestler

== Fictional characters ==
- Chiharu Eniwa, a character in the manga series Girl Got Game
- Chiharu Harukaze (千桜), a character from the manga and anime series Hayate the Combat Butler
- Chiharu Kise (ちはる), a character in the anime series Smile PreCure!
- Chiharu Mihara (千春), a character in the anime and manga series Cardcaptor Sakura
- Chiharu Mori (千春), a character in the romantic comedy manga series Dengeki Daisy
- Chiharu Nitta (千春), a character in the anime and manga series Boys Be...
- Chiharu Shinonome (千春), the main character of the manga and anime series Eiken
- Chiharu Tanaka (千春), a character in the manga series Lovely Complex
