= Chiharu Saiguchi =

Japanese judge (1938–2024)

Chiharu Saiguchi (才口 千晴, Saiguchi Chiharu; September 3, 1938 – April 17, 2024) was a Japanese attorney and justice of the Supreme Court of Japan.

== Life and career ==
Saiguchi attended Chuo University, graduating with an LLB in 1961, and was admitted to the bar in 1966. He practiced law as head of the Saiguchi Law Office from 1970 to 2004.

Saiguchi was known as an expert on Japanese bankruptcy laws. Following the bankruptcy of Japan Airlines, he headed a five-member investigation committee to look into compliance issues at the airline.

Saiguchi later served as advisor attorney to TMI Associates, a Tokyo law firm.

Saiguchi died from a stroke on April 17, 2024, at the age of 85.
