= My Lonesome Cowboy =

Sculpture by Takashi Murakami

- Artist: Takashi Murakami
- Year: 1998
- Medium: Sculpture (oil and acrylic on fiberglass and iron)
- Movement: Superflat
- Dimensions: 288 cm × 117 cm × 90 cm (9.45 ft × 3.84 ft × 3.0 ft)

My Lonesome Cowboy is a sculpture created in 1998 by Japanese artist Takashi Murakami. Produced during Murakami's so-called "bodily fluids" period, the 9.45 ft-tall (288 cm) statue depicts an anime-inspired figure ejaculating a large strand of semen. Like its companion piece Hiropon, My Lonesome Cowboy is an example of superflat art, an art movement founded by Murakami in the 1990s to criticize Japanese consumer culture. The sculpture is noted as among Murakami's most famous works.

== Description ==
External image
- Photographs of My Lonesome Cowboy at Sotheby's

My Lonesome Cowboy is an 9.45-foot-tall (288 cm) sculpture depicting a smiling nude anime-inspired male figure with spiked hair. The figure's legs are spread, and he is gripping his large erect penis, which is ejaculating semen that circles around his body like a lasso.

Both My Lonesome Cowboy and its earlier companion piece Hiropon were produced during Murakami's so-called "bodily fluids" phase in the late 1990s, in which he depicted highly sexualized figures inspired by otaku culture. The sculpture is evocative of shunga (a type of historic erotic ukiyo-e which often depicted figures with exaggerated genitalia) and hentai (anime and manga pornography). Murakami hired commercial manufacturers to produce the sculpture in order to maintain fidelity to its otaku source material.

My Lonesome Cowboy is an example of superflat art, an art movement founded by Murakami in the 1990s to criticize Japanese consumer culture. Its title is a dual reference: first to the 1968 Andy Warhol film Lonesome Cowboys, in regards to the pop art movement the film belonged to that was similarly influenced by consumer culture. It additionally references the 1957 film Loving You, in which Elvis Presley performs the song "Lonesome Cowboy" in a pose that similarly emphasizes his thighs and pelvis.

== Casts ==
Murakami produced three casts plus two artist's proofs of My Lonesome Cowboy, with the hair of the figure being of different colors in each of the casts. In 2008, the fourth numbered edition of My Lonesome Cowboy sold at an auction by Sotheby's for USD$15.1 million, nearly four times the amount at which it was valued. At the time, the sale made Murakami one of the most expensive living artists in the world.

== Reception ==
My Lonesome Cowboy is noted as among Murakami's most famous works. New York Times art critic Roberta Smith wrote that both it and Hiropon "mesmerize through an unsettling combination of innocence, carnal knowledge, beauty, exquisite artifice and arrested movement", though argued that My Lonesome Cowboy is "simplistically macho" compared to the more "nuanced" Hiropon. She nonetheless assesses both pieces favorably, arguing "after their shock value has declined, as all shock value must, they are still interesting to look at", arguing that both pieces are more successful than the erotic sculptures of Jeff Koons and Allen Jones. Art scholar Grace McQuilten is more critical of the piece, calling it "cute and colourful enough to appeal to a general audience at the same time as carrying off a semblance of social critique", arguing that it merely "reproduce[s] a popular fetish" and does not "challenge or modify the otaku stereotype".
