= Takashi Murakami =

Japanese artist (born 1962)

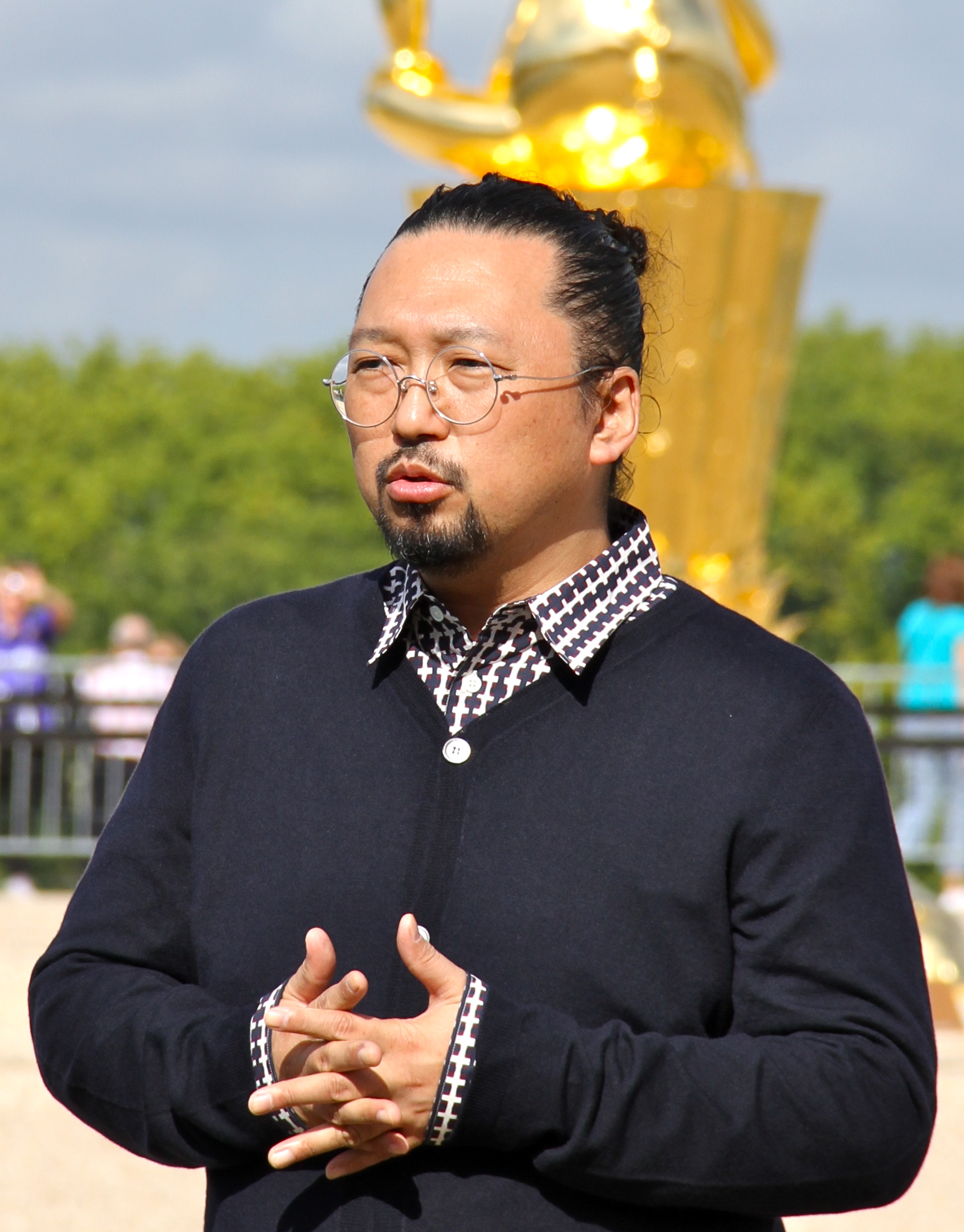
- Murakami at the Palace of Versailles, 2010
- Born: February 1, 1962 (age 64); Tokyo, Japan
- Education: Tokyo University of the Arts
- Known for: Contemporary art
- Movement: Superflat
- Awards: Japanese Fine Arts

Takashi Murakami (村上 隆, Murakami Takashi; born February 1, 1962) is a Japanese contemporary artist. He works in fine arts (such as painting and sculpture) as well as commercial media (such as fashion, merchandise, and animation) and is known for blurring the line between high and low arts. His work draws from the aesthetic characteristics of the Japanese artistic tradition and the nature of postwar Japanese culture. He has designed covers for several hip hop albums, namely Kanye West's Graduation (2007), Future's eponymous fifth studio album (2017), West and Kid Cudi's Kids See Ghosts (2018), and Juice Wrld's posthumous The Party Never Ends (2024).

Murakami is the founder and President of the art trading company Kaikai Kiki Co., Ltd. through which he manages several artists. He was the founder and organizer of the biannual art fair Geisai.

== Life and career ==
=== Academic background and early career ===
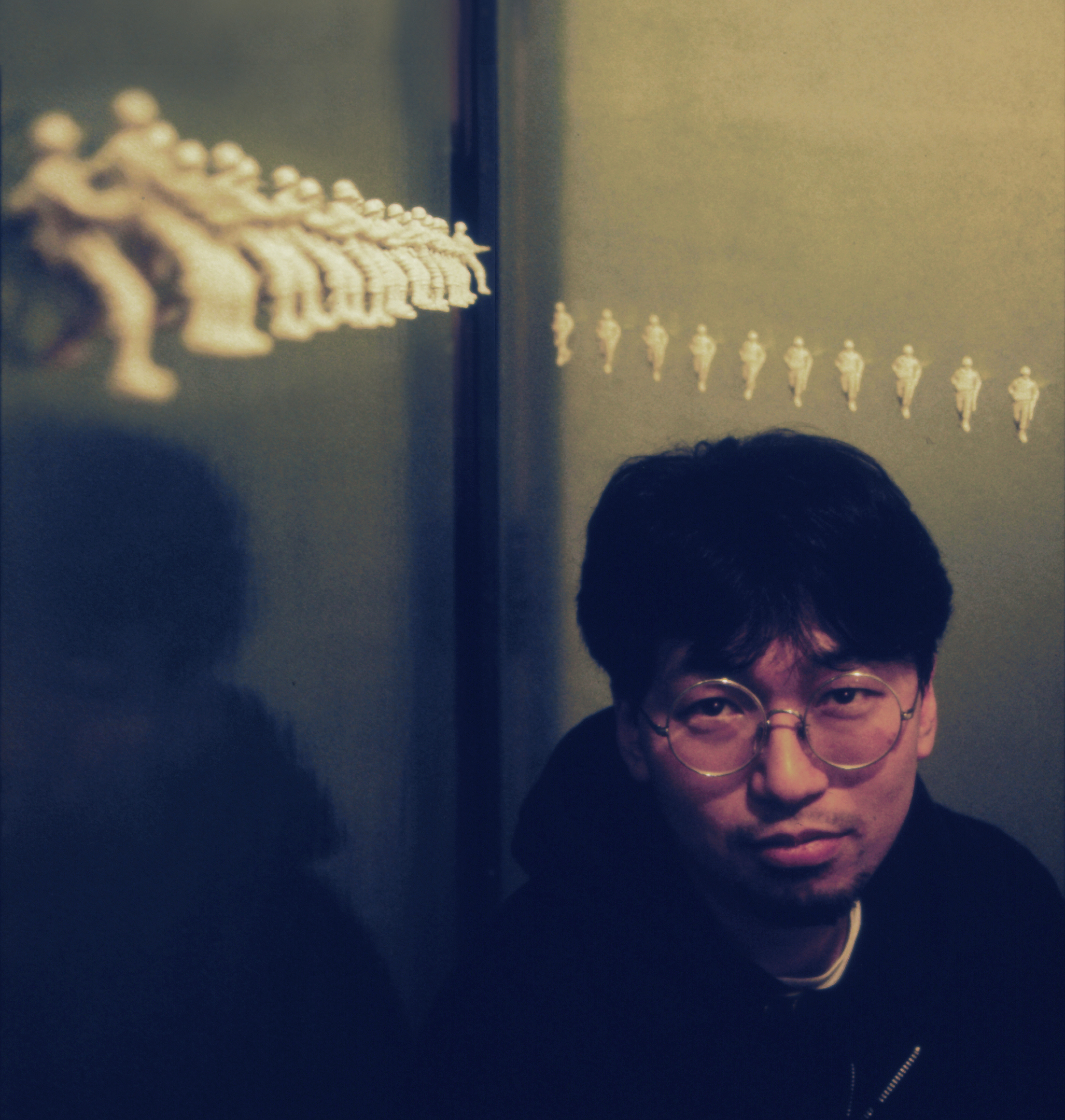
Artist Takashi Murakami with early work "Polyrhythm" at Galeri Mars in Tokyo 1992.

Murakami was born and raised in Tokyo, Japan. From early on, he was a fan of anime and manga (Japanese animation and comics respectively), and hoped to work in the animation industry. He attended Tokyo University of the Arts to acquire the drafting skills necessary to become an animator, but eventually majored in Nihonga, the 'traditional' style of Japanese painting that incorporates traditional Japanese artistic conventions, techniques and subjects. He earned his master's degree in 1988. Though he would go on to earn a Ph.D. in Nihonga (1993), he gradually became disillusioned with its insular, highly political world and started to explore more contemporary artistic styles, media, and strategies.

Murakami was dissatisfied with the state of contemporary art in Japan, believing it to be "a deep appropriation of Western trends." Thus, much of his early work was done in the spirit of social criticism and satire. On an article naming and explaining all of Murakami's pieces lies the infamous My Lonesome Cowboy, a companion to his earlier Hiropon. The sculpture is that of a naked anime character with blond spiky hair with a spiral trail of semen circling him. This piece is Murakami's most expensive piece to date selling for $15,100,000 at Sotheby's New York auction in 2008. Efforts from this period include performance art (Osaka Mixer Project, 1992), parodies of the "message" art popular in Japan in the early '90s, (Dobozite Dobozite Oshamanbe, 1993), and conceptual works (e.g. Randoseru Project, 1991). He also began developing his own pop icon, "Mr. DOB", which would later develop into a form of self-portraiture, the first of several endlessly morphing and recurring motifs seen throughout his work. Though he garnered attention, many of his early pieces were not initially well received in Japan.

=== New York ===
In 1994, Murakami received a fellowship from the Asian Cultural Council and participated in the PS1 International Studio Program in New York City for a year. During his stay, he was exposed to and highly inspired by Western contemporary artists such as Anselm Kiefer and especially the simulationism of artists such as Jeff Koons. He established a small studio, which, together with the Hiropon Factory in Japan, became the precursor to his company Kaikai Kiki. After returning to Japan, he would develop the core concepts behind his artistic practice and begin exhibiting regularly at major galleries and institutions across Europe and America.

=== Superflat ===
In 2000, Murakami published his "Superflat" theory in the catalogue for a group exhibition of the same name that he curated for the Museum of Contemporary Art, Los Angeles. The theory posits that there is a legacy of flat, 2-dimensional imagery from Japanese art history in manga and anime. This style differentiates itself from the western approach in its emphasis on surface and use of flat planes of color. Superflat also served as a commentary on postwar Japanese society in which, Murakami argues, differences in social class and popular taste have 'flattened,' producing a culture with little distinction between 'high' and 'low'. The theory provided the context for his work and he elaborated on it with the exhibitions "Coloriage" (2002, Fondation Cartier pour l'art contemporain, Paris) and "Little Boy: The Arts of Japan's Exploding Subculture" (2005, Japan Society, New York), which was named after Little Boy. These helped introduce Japan's lesser-known creative culture overseas and such curatorial projects would become an integral part of Murakami's multifaceted artistic practice. In the past decade, Murakami's curatorship expanded to include Kazunori Hamana, Yuji Uedaa, and Otani Workshop at Blum & Poe, New York (2016) and Juxtapox x Superflat at Vancouver Art Gallery (2016).

In accordance with the Superflat concept, Murakami's practice involves repackaging elements usually considered "low" or subcultural and presenting them in the "high-art" market. He then further flattens the playing field by repackaging his "high-art" works as merchandise, such as plush toys and T-shirts, making them available at more affordable prices.

=== Factory ===
In 1996, Murakami launched the Hiropon Factory, his production workshop, in order to work on a larger scale and in a more diverse array of media. His model inherits the atelier system which has long existed in Japanese painting, printmaking and sculpture and is common to anime and manga enterprises, such as Hayao Miyazaki's Studio Ghibli. In 2001, Hiropon Factory was incorporated as Kaikai Kiki Co., Ltd.

=== Collaborations ===
In 2002, at the invitation of designer Marc Jacobs, Murakami began his long-lasting collaboration with the fashion brand Louis Vuitton. He began by contributing artwork which was used in the design of a series of handbags. The series re-envisioned the company's monogram and was a huge commercial success. Though he had previously collaborated with fashion designers such as Issey Miyake Men by Naoki Takizawa, his work with Louis Vuitton made him widely known for blurring the line between 'high art' and commercialism. It also elevated him to celebrity status in his home country of Japan.

In 2007, Murakami provided the cover artwork for rapper Kanye West's album Graduation and directed an animated music video for West's song "Good Morning." He also provided cover artwork for West's 2018 collaboration album Kids See Ghosts with Kid Cudi.

For Graduation and "Good Morning", Murakami would later 're-appropriate' these projects by incorporating their imagery into his paintings and sculptures, further blurring the boundaries between art and commercial branding and even questioning the existence of such a boundary.

Asked about straddling the line between art and commercial products, Murakami responded:

I don't think of it as straddling. I think of it as changing the line. What I've been talking about for years is how in Japan, that line is less defined. Both by the culture and by the post-War economic situation. Japanese people accept that art and commerce will be blended; and in fact, they are surprised by the rigid and pretentious Western hierarchy of "high art." In the West, it certainly is dangerous to blend the two because people will throw all sorts of stones. But that's okay—I'm ready with my hard hat.

Murakami has also collaborated with a wide range of creators and industries in Japan, a prominent example being the image characters he created for the press relations campaign of the major urban real estate development Roppongi Hills.

In 2009, music producer Pharrell Williams unveiled a collaborative sculpture with Murakami at Art Basel, which Williams stated "illustrates the metaphor of value."

Murakami and McG directed short Akihabara Majokko Princess, where Kirsten Dunst sings a cover of The Vapors' 1980 song "Turning Japanese". This was shown at the "Pop Life" exhibition in London's Tate Modern museum from October 1, 2009, to January 17, 2010. It shows Dunst dancing around Akihabara, a shopping district in Tokyo, Japan.

In May 2014, with Pharrell and Kz of livetune, Murakami created a music video for the remix of the Hatsune Miku song "Last Night, Good Night (Re:Dialed)". The team was assembled by the YouTube channel The Creators Project, headed by Vice and Intel. The same year, Murakami's anime-inspired illustrations from his first film Jellyfish Eyes, also adorned a T-shirt by Billionaire Boys Club, the brand co-founded by Pharrell and Nigo.

In Fall of 2015, Takashi collaborated with Vans. The name of this collaboration was Vault By Vans x Takashi Murakami Collection. His artwork was on Vans classic slip on, apparel and skateboard decks for an illuminated time and only in selected stores. His artwork mostly consisted of his famous skull and flower designs.

In 2018, Takashi Murakami collaborated with fashion designer Virgil Abloh on an artwork series, mixing fashion with Murakami's art. Takashi and Virgil discuss their careers and their collaboration at length in their interview for Cultured Magazine's fall 2018 issue where they are featured on the cover.

In March 2019, Billie Eilish released one of two official music videos for "You Should See Me in a Crown", one being directed and animated by Takashi Murakami. Murakami stated in a press release that the anime-style video, which was animated using motion capture technology, took eight months for him to create. The video opens with an animated version of Eilish, dressed in a neon-green shirt and shorts, eventually morphing into a spider-like monster that wreaks havoc on a miniature city. The video features the "Blohsh", Eilish's signature logo, as well as Murakami's flowers. The late rapper Juice WRLD approached Murakami to do a project several weeks before his untimely death, as a result of which, the project could never be completed.

In March 2020, J Balvin released his album Colores featuring album cover designs and artwork by Takashi Murakami. The Murakami-designed artwork was carried over to merchandise to celebrate the release of his album.

In April 2020, Supreme released a Box Logo Tee featuring artwork from Murakami. All the proceeds went to HELP USA, in order to support youth and families facing homelessness during the COVID-19 pandemic.

In 2022, Murakami collaborated with Formula One driver Lewis Hamilton on his +44 fashion range. Murakami also designed his helmet for that year's Japanese Grand Prix.

In June 2024, Murakami collaborated with k-pop group NewJeans to create exclusive merchandise and album designs for their Japanese debut single "Supernatural".

In November 2024, Murakami designed the album cover for Juice WRLD's final posthumous studio album The Party Never Ends, and a limited-time loading screen for his collaboration in Fortnite.

In March 2025, Murakami collaborated with Topps to create a set of baseball cards celebrating Major League Baseball's 2025 Tokyo Series between the Los Angeles Dodgers and Chicago Cubs. In May 2025, he collaborated with the champagne brand Dom Pérignon for a campaign named "Creation is an Eternal Journey".

=== 2007–present ===
From 2007 to 2009, Murakami's first retrospective ©Murakami traveled from the Museum of Contemporary Art (MOCA) in Los Angeles (its multi-disciplinary approach to contemporary art), to the Brooklyn Museum of Art in New York, the Museum für Moderne Kunst in Frankfurt, and lastly the Guggenheim Museum Bilbao, Spain. Sarah Thornton tracks the early stages of the exhibition's planning, including in-depth curatorial meetings between Murakami and prominent museum figures, in Seven Days in the Art World. The exhibition earned widespread attention for, among other things, including a fully functioning Louis Vuitton boutique as one of the exhibits.

In 2008, Murakami was named one of Time magazine's "100 Most Influential People", the only visual artist included.

In September 2010 Murakami became the third contemporary artist, and first Japanese, to exhibit at the Palace of Versailles in France, filling 15 rooms and the park with his sculptures, paintings, a decorative carpet, and lamps.

On June 21, 2011, Google featured a doodle tagged as "First Day of Summer" which was created by Murakami. This was accompanied by a Winter Solstice doodle for the Southern Hemisphere.

In February 2012, Murakami opened an exhibition in Doha, Qatar. Titled Murakami-Ego, this showed around 60 old works alongside new ones designed especially for the exhibition. Among the new ones, a 100-metre long wall painting depicting the suffering of the Japanese people after the Fukushima nuclear disaster.

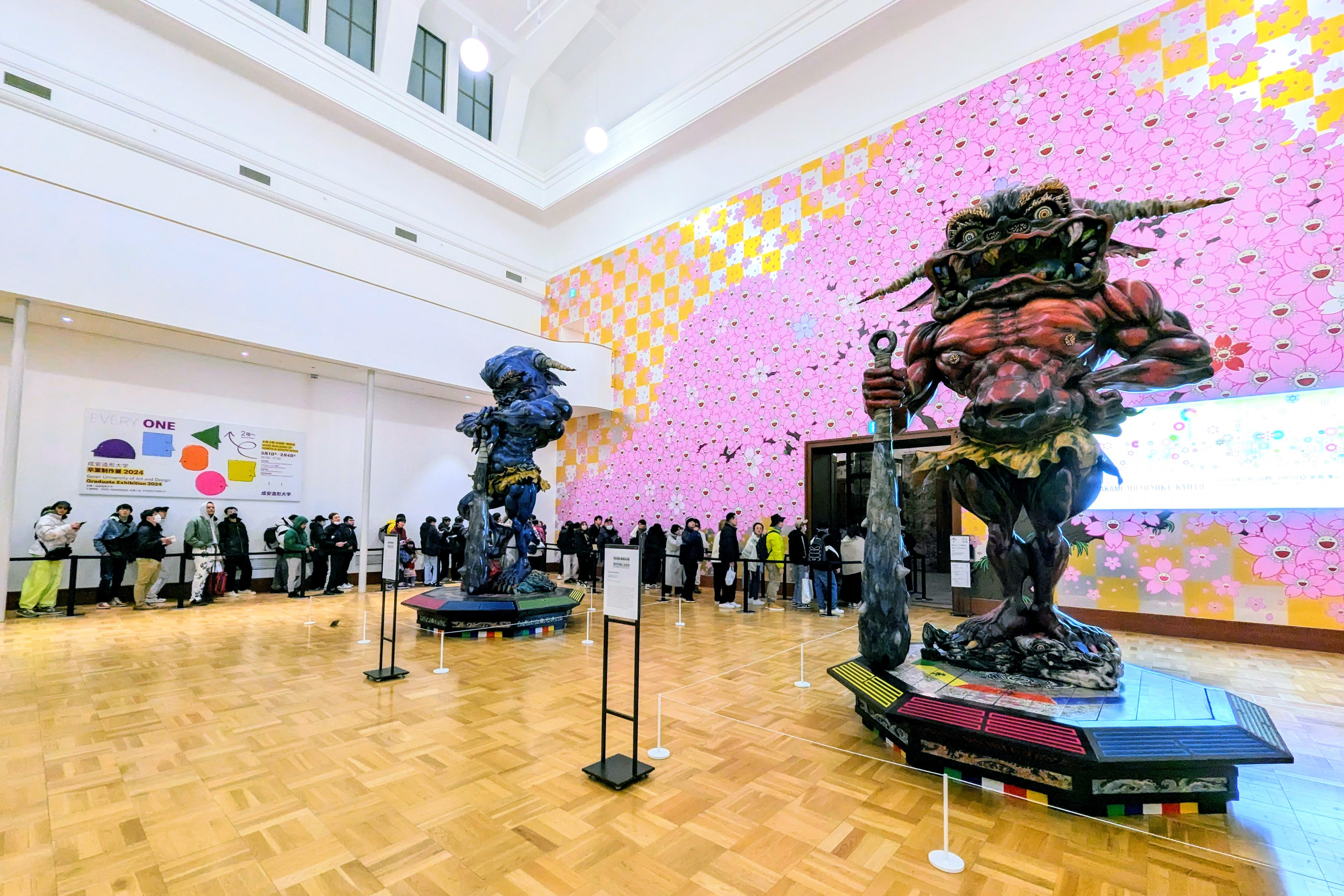
Museum guests wait to see “Takashi Murakami Mononoke Kyoto” at the Kyoto City Kyocera Museum of Art, Kyoto, Japan (2024).

In March 2013, livetune released a PV, directed by Murakami, for Redial, featuring Hatsune Miku.

In April 2013, Murakami's first feature film was released in theaters across Japan. Jellyfish Eyes (originally titled "Me me me no kurage)) is a live-action movie featuring CGI characters designed by Murakami called Friend.

In 2019, Murakami was working on his own album of original folk songs, inspired by Japanese group Happy End.

In December 2024, the largest private collection of Murakami prints was displayed in the exhibition "Tokyo Calling" at Guy Hepner, New York which featured over 30 original prints and explored the artist's superflat style.

== Technique ==
Murakami's art encompasses a wide range of media and is generally described as superflat. It has been noted for its use of color, incorporation of motifs from Japanese traditional and popular culture, flat/glossy surfaces, and content that could be described at once as "cute", "psychedelic", or "satirical". Among his best known recurring motifs are smiling flowers, Mr. DOB, mushrooms, skulls, Buddhist iconography, and the sexual complexes of otaku culture. One of Murakami's most famous pieces known as 'Hiropon' brings to light his embrace of otaku culture. The sculpture that was created in 2001 is said to show the "otaku culture and its strange, shocking sexuality in full force". The concept of the smiling flowers was revealed in an interview to be "evoked repressed, contradictory emotions and collective trauma of Japanese locals triggered by the Hiroshima and Nagasaki bombings back in 1945." In addition to large paintings such as 727 (permanent collection Museum of Modern Art, New York) and Tan Tan Bo Puking – a.k.a. Gero Tan, he has also produced sculptures, balloons, 'all-over' wallpaper installations, animated works, prints, posters, and assorted merchandise.

=== Strategic approach ===
Cosmos Ball by Takashi Murakami, molded plastic, 2000, Honolulu Museum of Art

Murakami has expressed since early on a frustration with the lack of a reliable and sustainable art market in postwar Japan. Largely for this reason, he formulated a strategy wherein he would first establish himself in the Western art world and then import himself back to Japan, building a new type of art market in the process. In order to create something rooted in his own Japanese culture and history but still fresh and valid internationally, he began searching for something that could be considered 'uniquely Japanese.' After concluding that elements of 'high' art were confounding at best, he began to focus on Japan's 'low' culture, especially anime and manga, and the larger subculture of otaku. His artistic style and motifs (cute [kawaii]/disturbing anime-esque characters rendered in bright colors, flat and highly glossy surfaces, life-size sculptures of anime figurines) derived from this strategy. This is demonstrated in his whimsical Cosmos Ball from 2000, in the collection of the Honolulu Museum of Art.

=== Market value ===
On November 11, 2003, ARTnews described Murakami's work as being in great demand. Hiropon (1997), satirical sculpture, standing a bit over 7 feet tall, of an anime character with oversized lactating breasts whose milk stream forms a jump rope made of fiberglass, sold for $427,500 at Christie's auction house in May 2002. Miss ko2 (1996), a 6-foot-tall model of an anime-inspired blonde girl in a red and white maid outfit, was sold for $567,500 in 2003, and was put up for auction in 2010, where it sold for 22.9 million HKD. In May 2008, My Lonesome Cowboy (1998), an anime-inspired sculpture of a masturbating boy whose semen stream forms a lasso, sold for $15.2 million at Sotheby's, making it his most highly valued piece. As of 2020, Murakami's net-worth is estimated to be around US$100 million, and the value of his works continue to rise.

== Kaikai Kiki ==
Murakami has incorporated his operations as Kaikai Kiki Co., Ltd. in Japan (2001), Kaikai Kiki New York, LLC in New York (2001), and Kaikai Kiki LA, LLC in Los Angeles (2010). The name "Kaikai Kiki" (カイカイキキ) which means "brave, strong and sensitive", was borrowed from a critic in the late 17th century who used it to describe the paintings of Eitoku Kano.

Kaikai Kiki executes Murakami's wide range of artistic endeavors and consists of both offices and production studios. In addition to handling the production and promotion of Murakami's artwork and projects, the company manages the careers of young artists, organizes international art projects, produces and promotes merchandise, and handles the organization and operation of the Geisai art fair.

Having earned success and recognition internationally, Murakami has devoted himself to nurturing and supporting the careers of a younger generation of Japanese artists. Likening the operation to that of a record label, he offers both logistical support and practical career advice. Through this endeavor, he also seeks to build an original and sustainable art market in Japan.

In 2008, Kaikai Kiki converted the basement space beneath its Tokyo office into an art gallery. Kaikai Kiki Gallery has held exhibitions not only for the artists under its management but also for such international names as Erik Foss, Mark Grotjahn, and Friedrich Kunath. All exhibitions are curated by Murakami.

A second gallery called Hidari Zingaro was opened in 2010 and has now expanded to include four separate locations within the Nakano Broadway shopping mall in Nakano, Tokyo.

The company and its galleries represent a number of prominent international artists including Takashi Murakami, KAWS, Mark Grotjahn, Anselm Reyle, Matthew Monahan, Seonna Hong, Aya Takano, Chiho Aoshima, ob, Mr., Fantasista Utamaro, Virgil Abloh, Michael Rikio Ming Hee Ho, Kazumi Nakamura, Otani Workshop, Yūji Ueda, Chinatsu Ban, Rei Sato, and Friedrich Kunath. The company began in Saitama, Japan in Asaka City, and now has offices in Tokyo, Japan in the Moto-Azabu neighborhood and New York as well as affiliates in Berlin and Taiwan.

== Geisai ==
From 2002 until 2014, Murakami organized a unique direct-participatory art fair called Geisai. It was held once per year in Japan and once per year in a different city, such as Taipei, or Miami. Rather than give space to pre-screened galleries, the fair allowed artists to create their own booths and interact directly with potential buyers.

== NFTs ==
Murakami was involved in NFTs from April 2021 but his first project, "Murakami.Flowers", was suspended by the artist shortly after its release due to his concern about his little knowledge of the topic. The idea of creating NFTs stemmed from his financial problems during the beginning of the COVID-19 pandemic. In November 2021 he collaborated with Nike-owned company RTFKT Studios on CloneX avatar projects. In January 2022 he announced resuming work on "Murakami.Flowers".

== Books ==
- Murakami, Takashi "Geijutsu Kigyoron" ISBN 978-4-344-01178-6
- Murakami, Takashi "Geijutsu Tosoron" ISBN 978-4-344-01912-6
- Murakami, Takashi "Summon Monsters? Open The Door? Heal? Or Die?" ISBN 978-4-939148-03-3
- Murakami, Takashi "Superflat" ISBN 978-4-944079-20-9
- Murakami, Takashi "Little Boy: The Arts of Japan's Exploding Subculture" ISBN 978-0-300-10285-7
- Cruz, Amanda/Friis-Hansen, Dana/Matsui, Midori "Takashi Murakami: The Meaning of the Nonsense of the Meaning" ISBN 978-0-8109-6702-1
- Schimmel, Paul "©Murakami" ISBN 978-0-8478-3003-9
- Le Bon, Laurent "Murakami Versailles" ISBN 978-2-915173-72-7
