= Chiaki Hayashi =

Japanese businesswoman

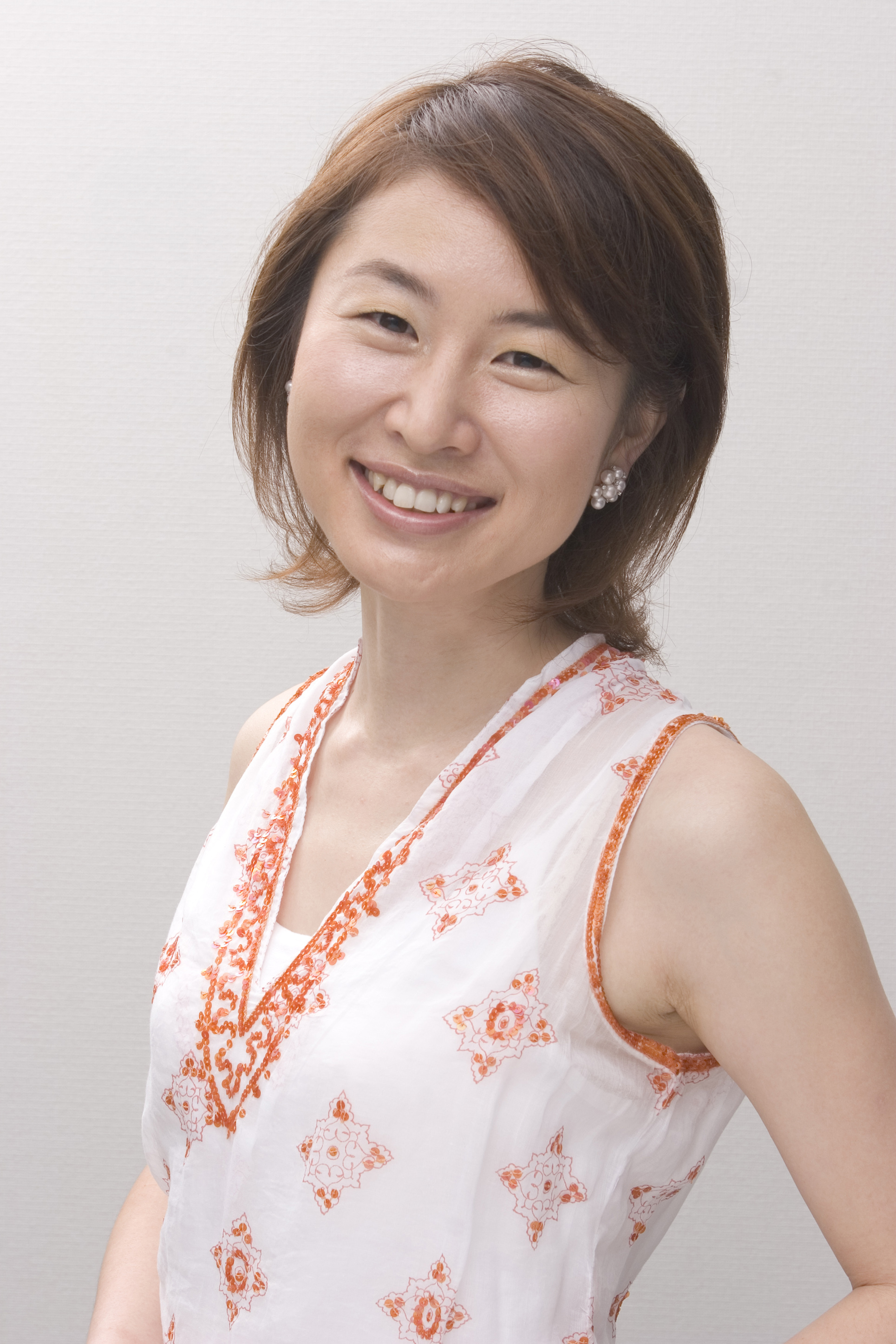
- Education: Waseda University; Boston University
- Known for: Creative Commons, Loftwork Inc.

Chiaki Hayashi (林 千晶, Hayashi Chiaki) (born 1971) is a Japanese business woman and Asian Projects Co-ordinator at Creative Commons.

== Career ==
She founded the Japanese creative agency Loftwork, Inc. in 2000. Since 2006, Chiaki also sits on the advisory board at Creative Commons Japan and previously worked as business reporter at Kyodo News, a Japanese news agency and marketing at Kao Corporation.

On June 30, 2009, Hayashi became a certified Project Management Professional (PMP) from the Project Management Institute. She received a Bachelor of Arts in Commerce from Waseda University and a Master of Science in Business Journalism from Boston University.

In 2014 Hayashi founded FabCafe LLP, which provides tools for do it yourself enthousiasts.

In 2017 Hayashi was named an Awarded Innovator by Wired Japan for her work with Loftwork, FabCafe, and OpenCU, an online learning platform.
