= Chiaki Ohara =

Japanese pianist

Chiaki Ohara is a Japanese pianist known for her collaboration in musical pieces such as "Hall Of Mirrors" and "Fantasy".

== Early life ==
Chiaki Ohara, born in Osaka, Japan, received her first piano lessons at the age of four. From 1972 to 1975 she attended the high school of Osaka College of Music, where since 1963 she has already been a piano student of Prof. Tetsuro Kanzawa. In parallel, she took private lessons with Tomiko Miyajima from 1974 to 1980.

Currently, she also performs regularly in duo with Sandra Leonie Ritter (saxophone). This cooperation is already equipped with its own CD production, released at the label "music Leondra documented". Other chamber music partner of Chiaki Ohara included Sergio Azzolini, Ingo Goritzki, Dennis Kuhn, Peter Leiner, Will Sanders and Markus Stockhausen.
