= Otto Lagerfeld =

German entrepreneur (1881–1967)

- Born: Otto Christian Ludwig Lagerfeld; 20 September 1881; Hamburg, Germany
- Died: 4 July 1967 (aged 85); Baden-Baden, West Germany
- Occupation: Businessman
- Spouses: Theresia Feigl (m. 1922; died 1922) Elisabeth Bahlmann (m. 1930)
- Children: 3, including Karl Lagerfeld

Otto Christian Ludwig Lagerfeld (20 September 1881 – 4 July 1967) was a German businessman, who in 1919 founded the German company Lagerfeld & Co, which imported evaporated milk.

He was the son of a wine merchant from Hamburg, Tönnies Johann Otto Lagerfeld and his wife Maria Wilhelmine Franziska Lagerfeld (née Wiegels).

== Personal life ==
In 1930, Lagerfeld married firstly to Theresia Feigl, who died while giving child birth to their only daughter:

- Theodora Dorothea "Thea" Lagerfeld (1922–2007), who married Count Thomas Friedrich Hans von der Schulenburg (1919–1944), without issue.

In 1930, he married secondly to Elisabeth Josefa Emilie Bahlmann, daughter of the Catholic Centre Party local politician Heinrich Maria Karl Bahlmann, and they had two children:

- Martha Christiane "Christel" Lagerfeld (1931–2015), married American-born Robert Arthur Johnson (1922–2014), the former tax collector of Wethersfield, Connecticut, with whom she settled in Portland, Connecticut and had three children.
- Karl Lagerfeld (1933–2019), without issue.

His family was mainly shielded from the deprivations of World War II due to his membership in the Nazi party and his business interests in Germany through the firm Glücksklee-Milch GmbH. Otto Lagerfeld had been in San Francisco during the 1906 earthquake.
