= Steven Lagerfeld =

Steven Lagerfeld is the former editor of The Wilson Quarterly, the flagship publication of the Woodrow Wilson International Center for Scholars, which he led from 1999 until winter 2014.

Lagerfeld was born in New York City and received a bachelor's degree from Cornell University in 1977. Before joining the editorial staff of The Wilson Quarterly in 1981, he was assistant managing editor of The Public Interest. He was named editor of the WQ in 1999, replacing Jay Tolson.

Lagerfeld's articles have been published in the Atlantic Monthly, Harper's, The New Republic, The Wall Street Journal, and elsewhere.
