= Chinatsu Ban =

Japanese artist

Chinatsu Ban (坂 知夏 Ban Chinatsu, born 1973) is a Japanese artist.

Ban has a reputation as an artist drawing elephant and human figures on washi paper. A sculpture, titled "V W X Yellow Elephant Underwear/H I J Kiddy Elephant", featured in an exhibit about modern Japanese culture called Little Boy: The Arts of Japan's Exploding Subculture.

Born in Aichi Prefecture, Ban graduated from Tama Art University with a degree in oil painting in 1995.
