= Machino =

Machino may refer to:

- Henmaru Machino (born 1969), Japanese artist
- Kazuyoshi Machino, Japanese photographer, winner of the Higashikawa Prize in the Domestic Photographer nomination
- Shuto Machino (町野 修斗; born 1999), Japanese footballer
- Saku Machino, (1941–2026), Japanese professor
- Machino (rural locality), several rural localities in Russia
