= Art movement =

Styles of art associated with periods of time and/or locations of artistic activity

An art movement is a tendency or style in art with a specific art philosophy or goal, followed by a group of artists during a specific period of time, (usually a few months, years or decades) or, at least, with the heyday of the movement defined within a number of years. Art movements were especially important in modern art, when each consecutive movement was considered a new avant-garde movement. Western art had been, from the Renaissance up to the middle of the 19th century, underpinned by the logic of perspective and an attempt to reproduce an illusion of visible reality (figurative art). By the end of the 19th century many artists felt a need to create a new style which would encompass the fundamental changes taking place in technology, science and philosophy (abstract art).

== Concept ==
According to theories associated with modernism and also the concept of postmodernism, art movements are especially important during the period of time corresponding to modern art. The period of time called "modern art" is posited to have changed approximately halfway through the 20th century and art made afterward is generally called contemporary art. Postmodernism in visual art begins and functions as a parallel to late modernism and refers to that period after the "modern" period called contemporary art. The postmodern period began during late modernism (which is a contemporary continuation of modernism), and according to some theorists postmodernism ended in the 21st century. During the period of time corresponding to "modern art" each consecutive movement was often considered a new avant-garde.

Also during the period of time referred to as "modern art" each movement was seen corresponding to a somewhat grandiose rethinking of all that came before it, concerning the visual arts. Generally there was a commonality of visual style linking the works and artists included in an art movement. Verbal expression and explanation of movements has come from the artists themselves, sometimes in the form of an art manifesto, and sometimes from art critics and others who may explain their understanding of the meaning of the new art then being produced.

In the visual arts, many artists, theorists, art critics, art collectors, art dealers and others mindful of the unbroken continuation of modernism and the continuation of modern art even into the contemporary era, ascribe to and welcome new philosophies of art as they appear. Postmodernist theorists posit that the idea of art movements are no longer as applicable, or no longer as discernible, as the notion of art movements had been before the postmodern era. There are many theorists however who doubt as to whether or not such an era was actually a fact; or just a passing fad.

The term refers to tendencies in visual art, novel ideas and architecture, and sometimes literature. In music it is more common to speak about genres and styles instead. See also cultural movement, a term with a broader connotation.

As the names of many art movements use the -ism suffix (for example cubism and futurism), they are sometimes referred to as isms.

== 19th century ==
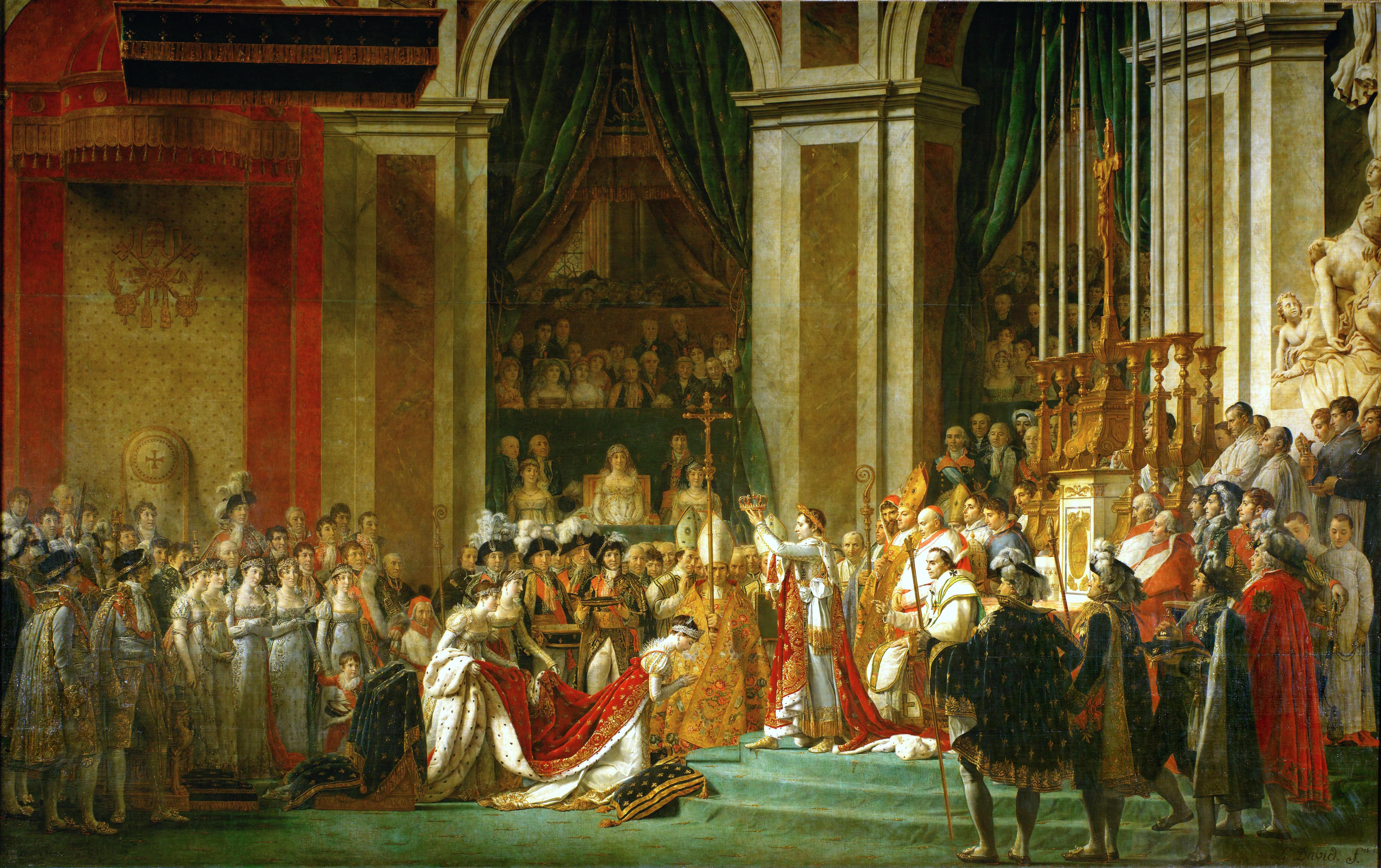
Jacques-Louis David, The Coronation of Napoleon, (1806), Musée du Louvre, neoclassicism

Eugène Delacroix, Liberty Leading the People 1830, Romanticism

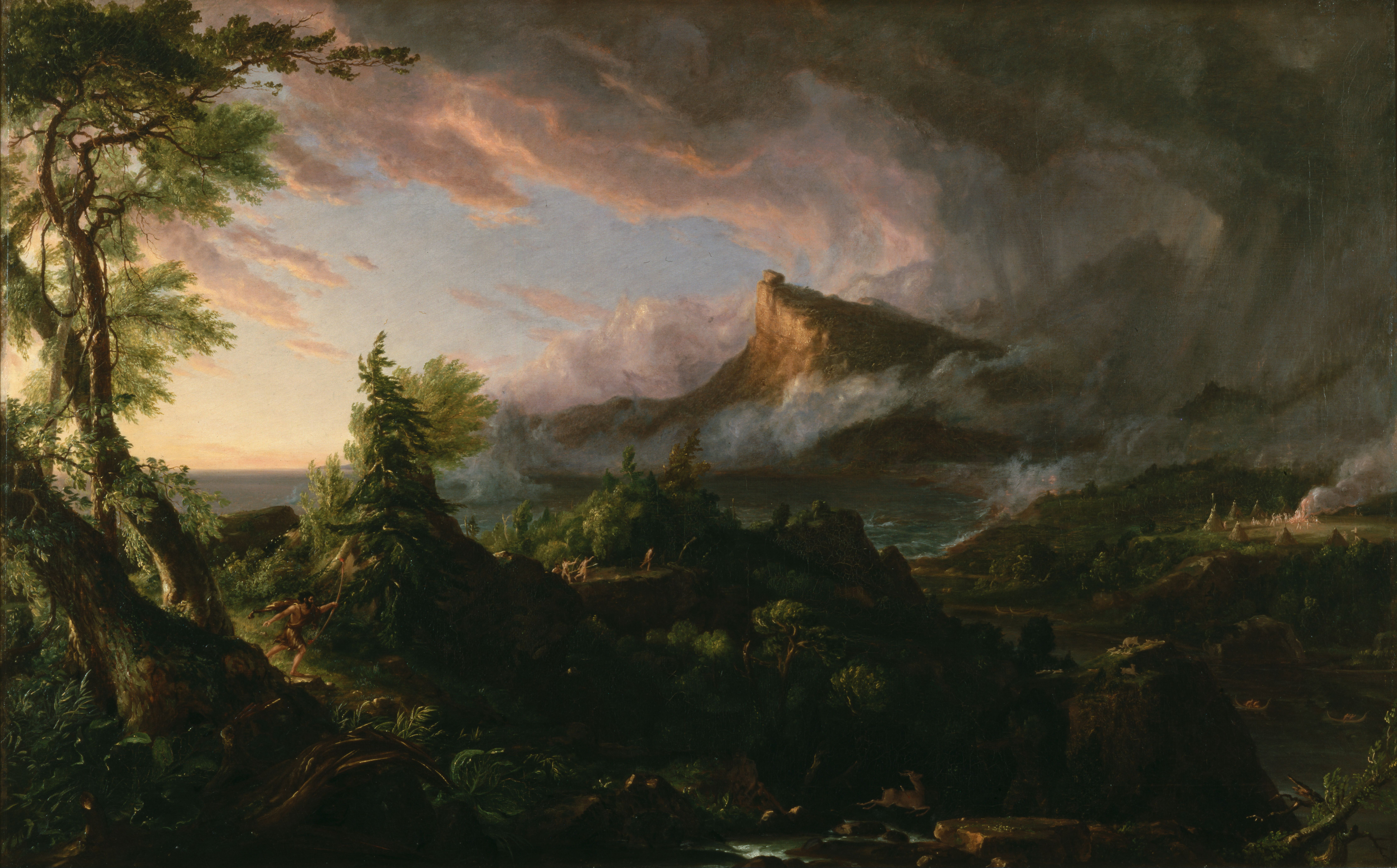
Thomas Cole, The Course of Empire: The Savage State, 1836, Hudson River School

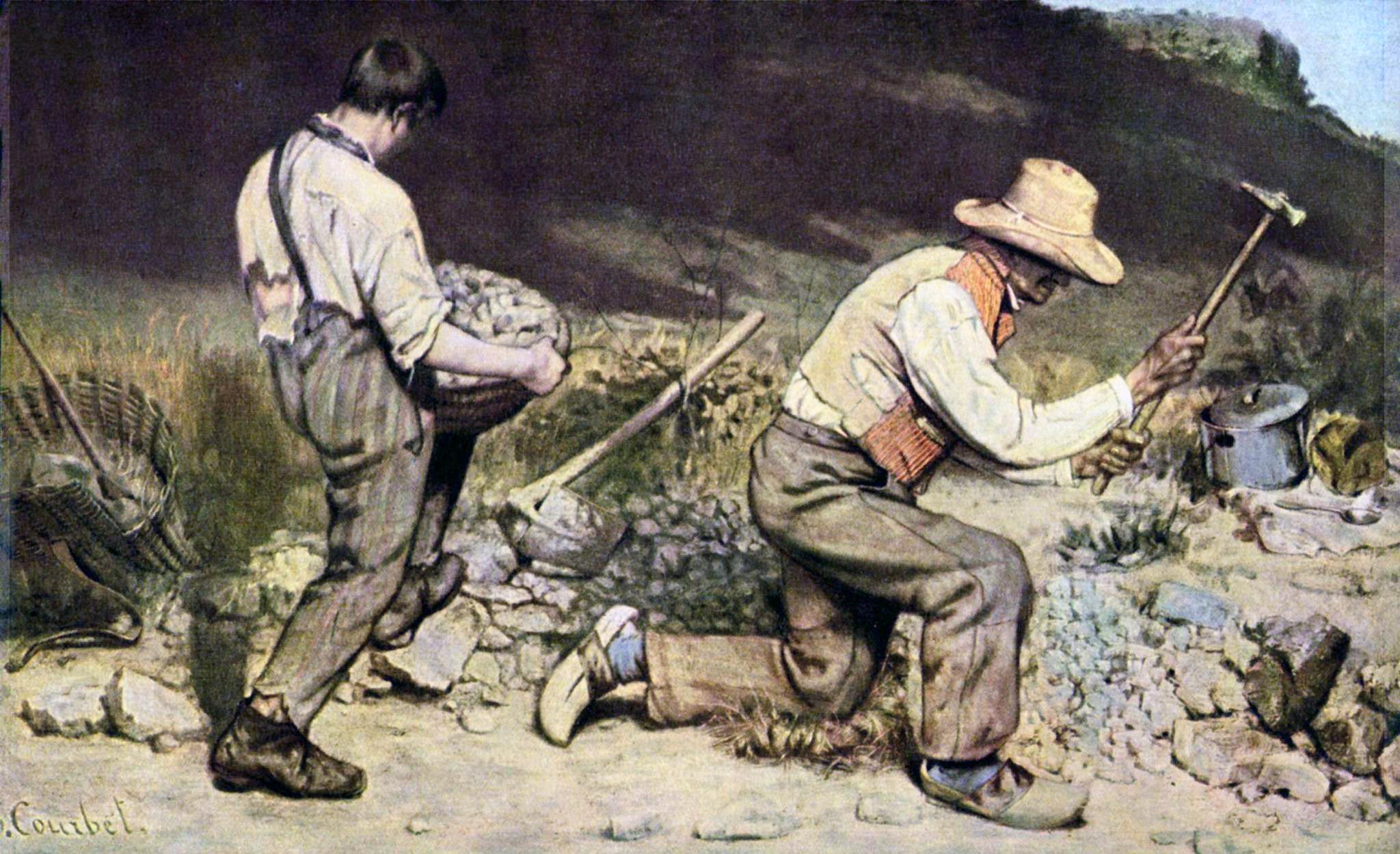
Gustave Courbet, Stone-Breakers, 1849, Realist School

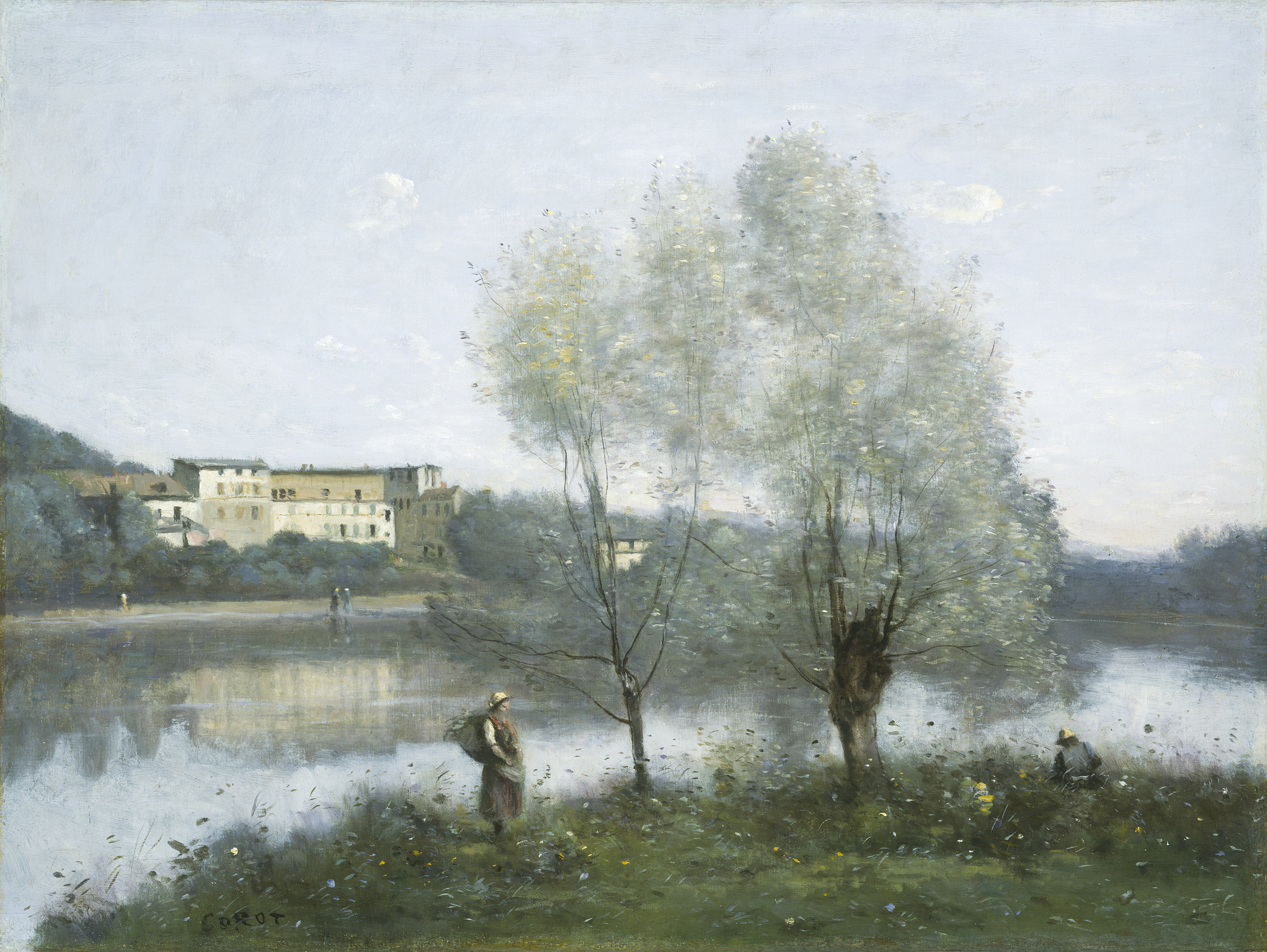
Jean-Baptiste-Camille Corot, c. 1867, Ville d'Avray National Gallery of Art, Washington, D.C., Barbizon School

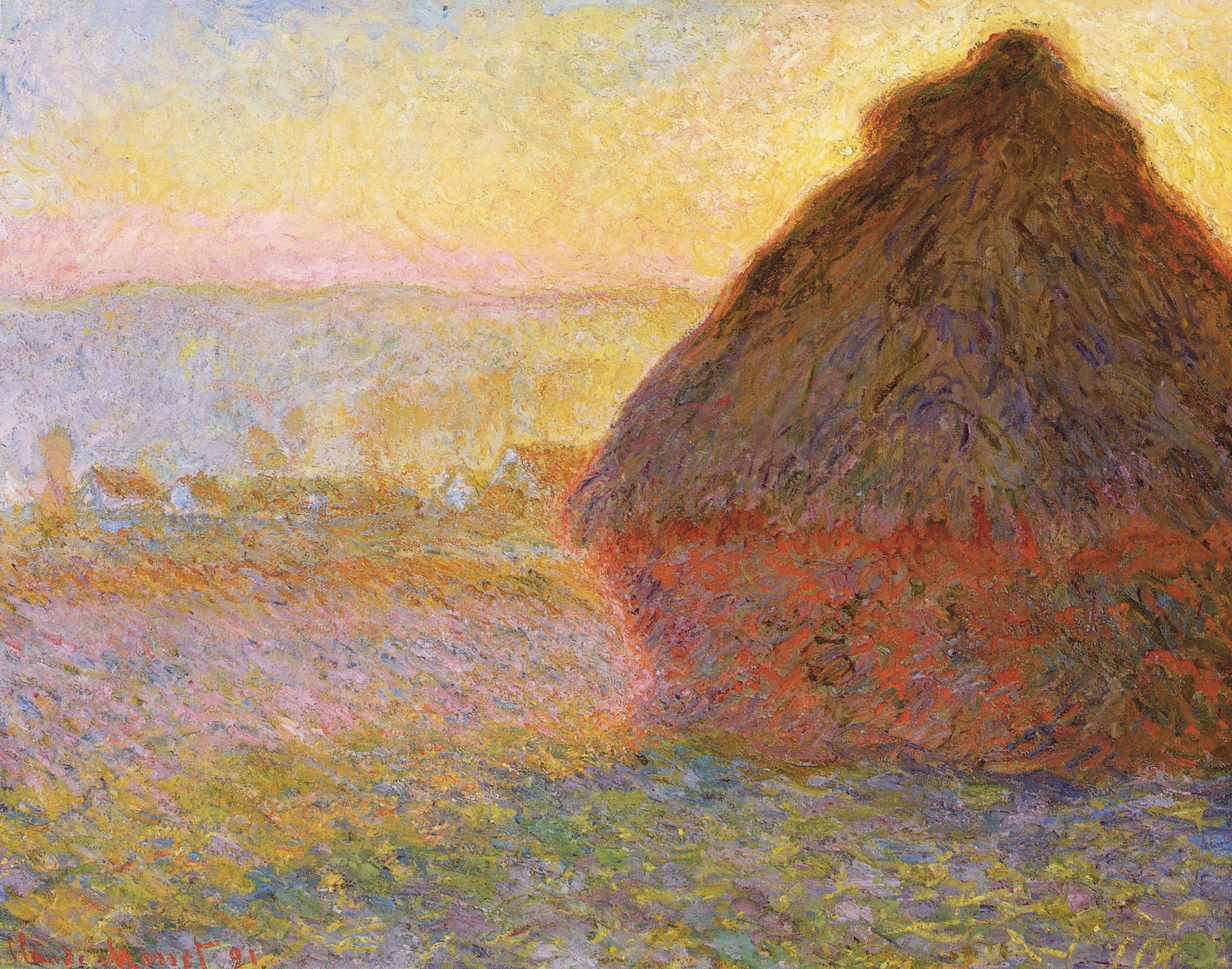
Claude Monet, Haystacks, (sunset), 1890–1891, Museum of Fine Arts, Boston, Impressionism

Vincent van Gogh, The Starry Night, 1889, Post-Impressionism

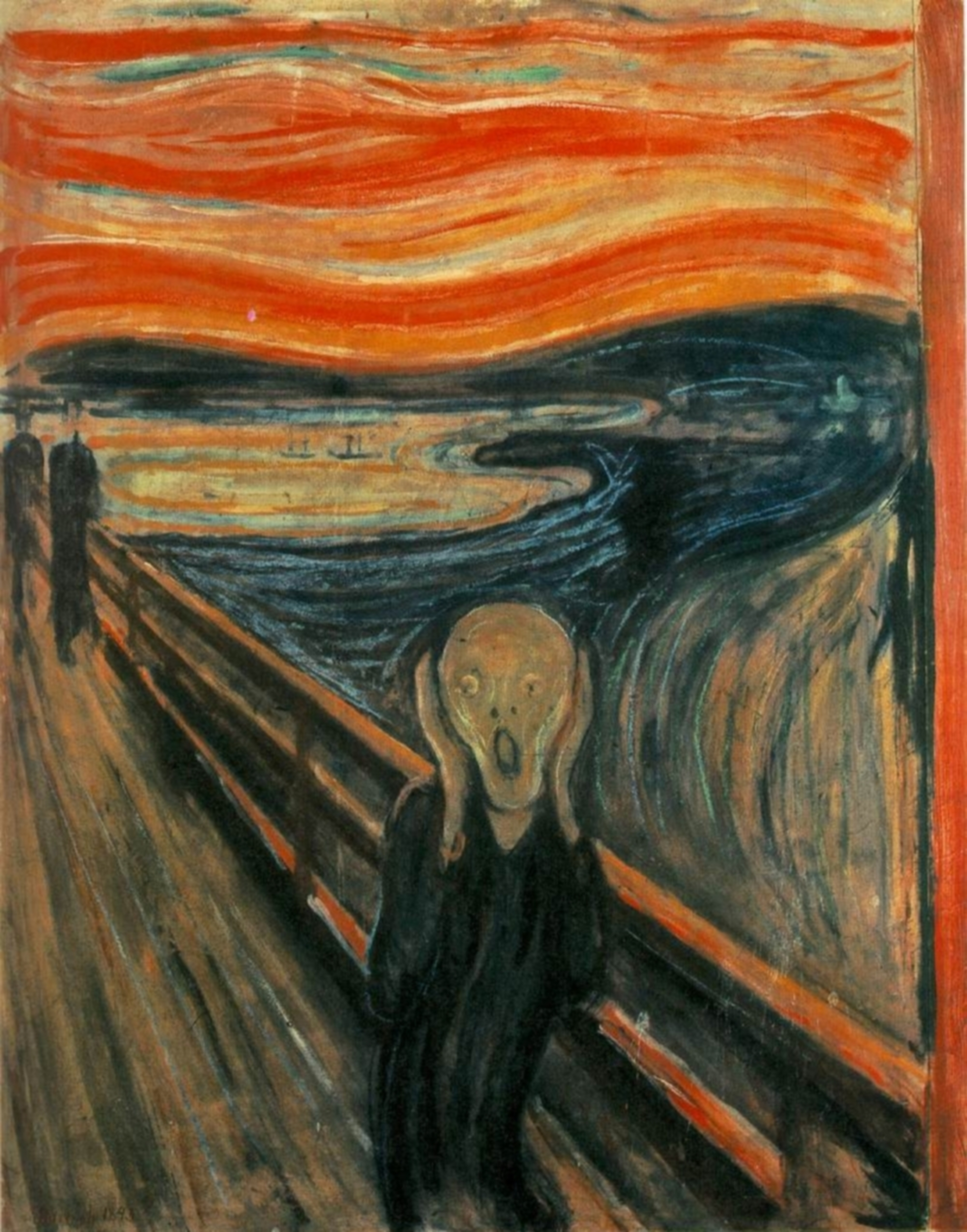
Edvard Munch, The Scream, early example of Expressionism
- Academic, c. 16th century–20th century
- Aesthetic Movement
- American Barbizon school
- American Impressionism
- Amsterdam Impressionism
- Art Nouveau, c. 1890–1910
- Arts and Crafts Movement, founded 1860s
- Barbizon school, c. 1830s–1870s
- Biedermeier, c. 1815–1848
- Cloisonnism, c. 1888–1900s (decade)
- Danish Golden Age c. 1800s-1850s
- Decadent movement
- Divisionism, c. 1880s–1910s
- Düsseldorf School
- Etching revival
- Expressionism, c. 1890s–1930s
- German Romanticism, c. 1790s–1850s
- Gründerzeit
- Hague School, c. 1860s–1890s
- Heidelberg School, c. 1880s–1900s (decade)
- Hoosier Group
- Hudson River School, c. 1820s–1900s (decade)
- Hurufiyya movement mid-20th-century in North Africa and the Middle East
- Impressionism, c. 1860s–1920s
- Incoherents, c. 1882-1890s
- Jugendstil
- Les Nabis, c. 1890s–1900s (decade)
- Les Vingt
- Letras y figuras, c. 1845–1900s
- Luminism
- Lyon School
- Macchiaioli c. 1850s–1900s (decade)
- Mir iskusstva, founded 1898
- Modernism, c. 1860s-ongoing
- Naturalism
- Nazarene, c. 1810s–1830
- Neo-classicism, c. 1780s–1900s (decade)
- Neo-impressionism, c. 1880s–1910s
- Norwegian romantic nationalism, c. 1840–1867
- Norwich School, founded 1803
- Orientalism
- Peredvizhniki
- Pointillism, c. 1880s–1910s
- Pont-Aven School, c. 1850s–1890s
- Post-Impressionism, c. 1880s–1900s (decade)
- Pre-Raphaelite Brotherhood
- Realism, c. 1850s–1900s (decade)
- Realism, c. 1850s–1900s (decade)
- Romanticism, c. 1750s–1890s
- Secession groups, c. 1890s–1910s
- Society of American Artists, c. 1877–1906
- Spanish Eclecticism, c. 1845-1890s
- Symbolism
- Synthetism, c. 1877–1900s (decade)
- Tipos del País
- Tonalism, c. 1880–1915
- Vienna Secession, founded 1897
- Volcano School
- White Mountain art, c. 1820s–1870s
- Spiritualist art, c. 1870–

== 20th century ==
=== 1900–1921 ===
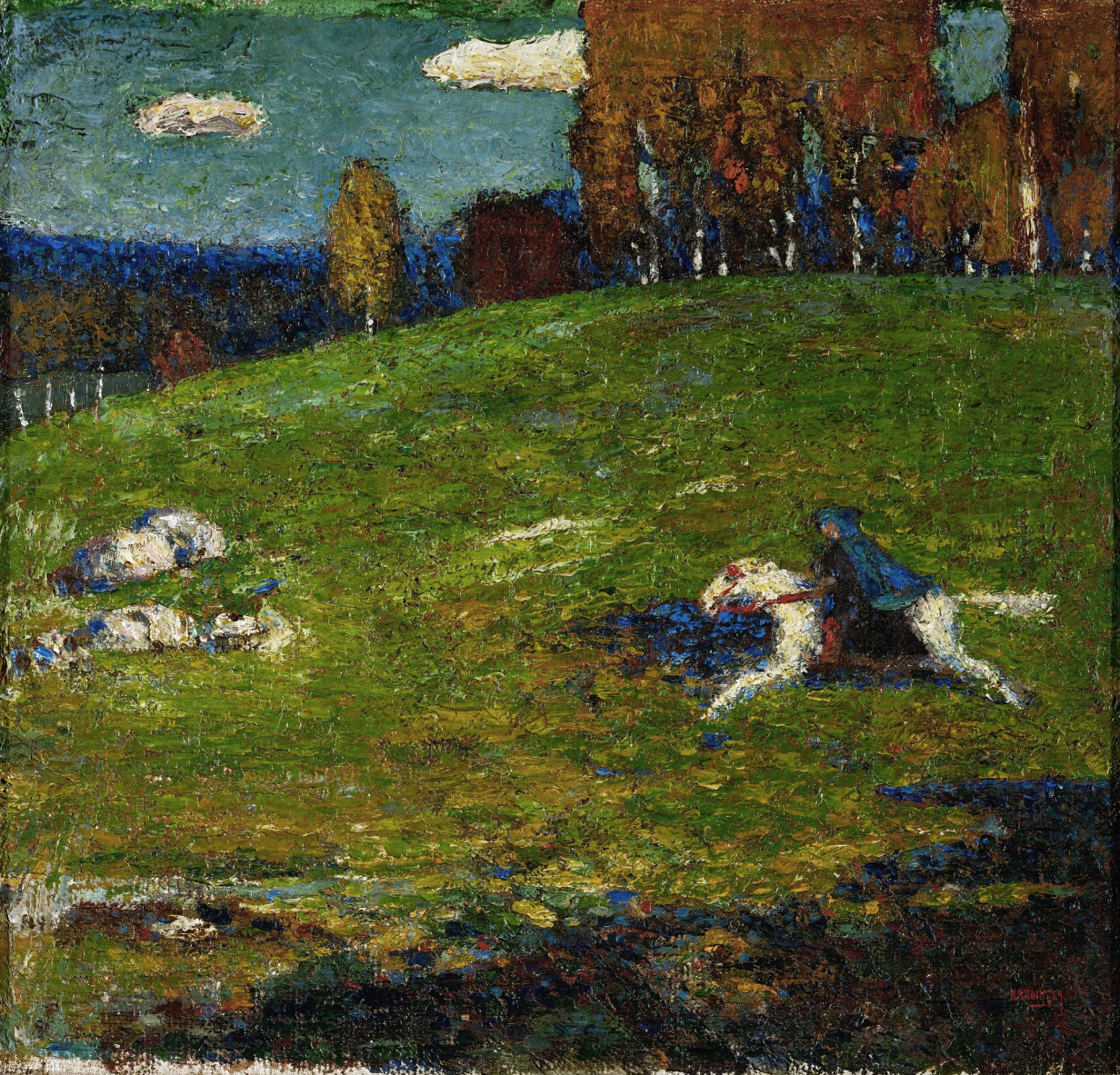
Wassily Kandinsky, 1903, Der Blaue Reiter painting, Der Blaue Reiter 21.1 cm × 54.6 cm (8.3 in × 21.5 in)

Pablo Picasso, Family of Saltimbanques, 1905, Picasso's Rose Period

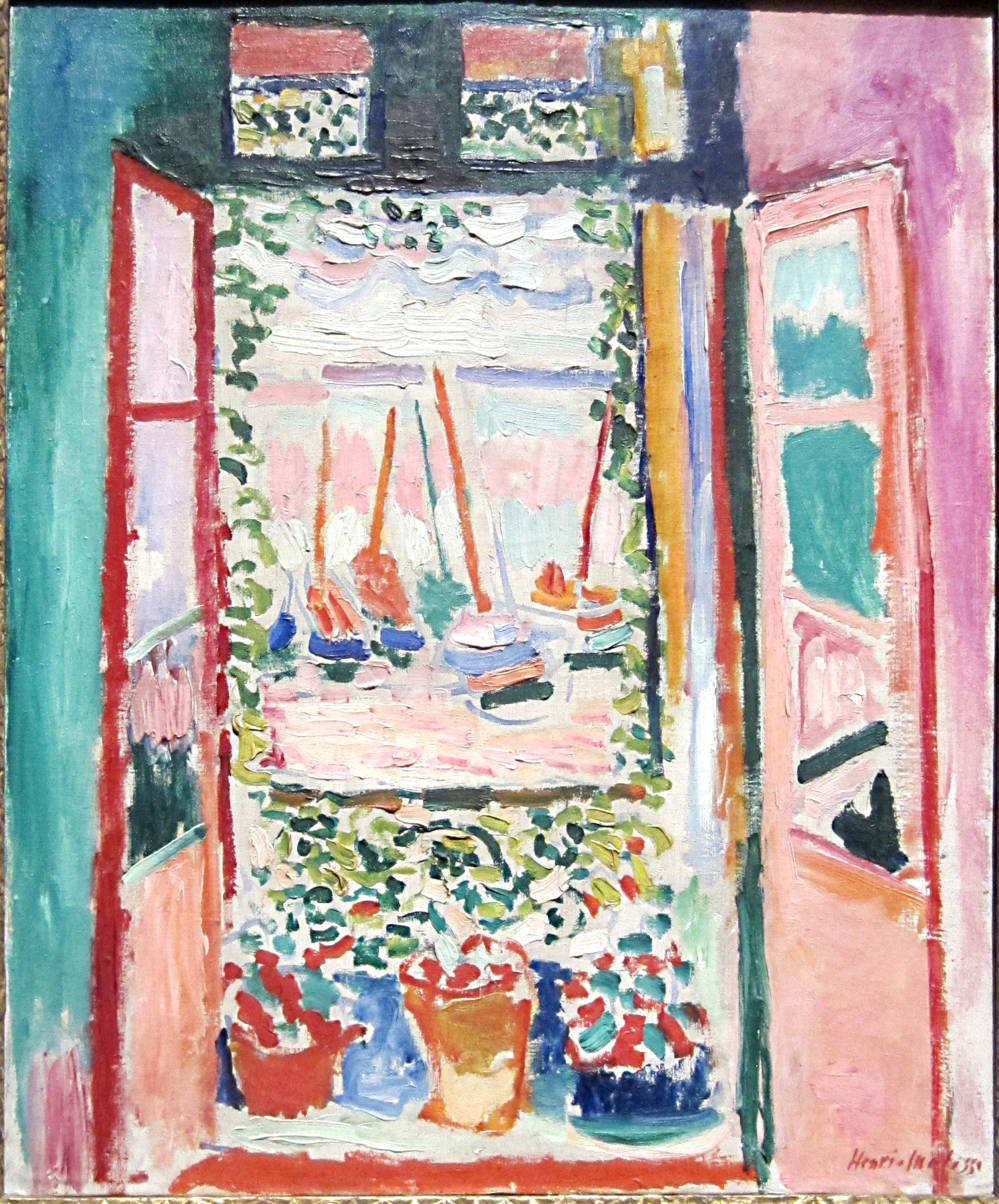
Henri Matisse, The Open Window, 1905, Fauvism

Pablo Picasso, Les Demoiselles d'Avignon, 1907, Proto-Cubism

Georges Braque 1910, Analytic Cubism

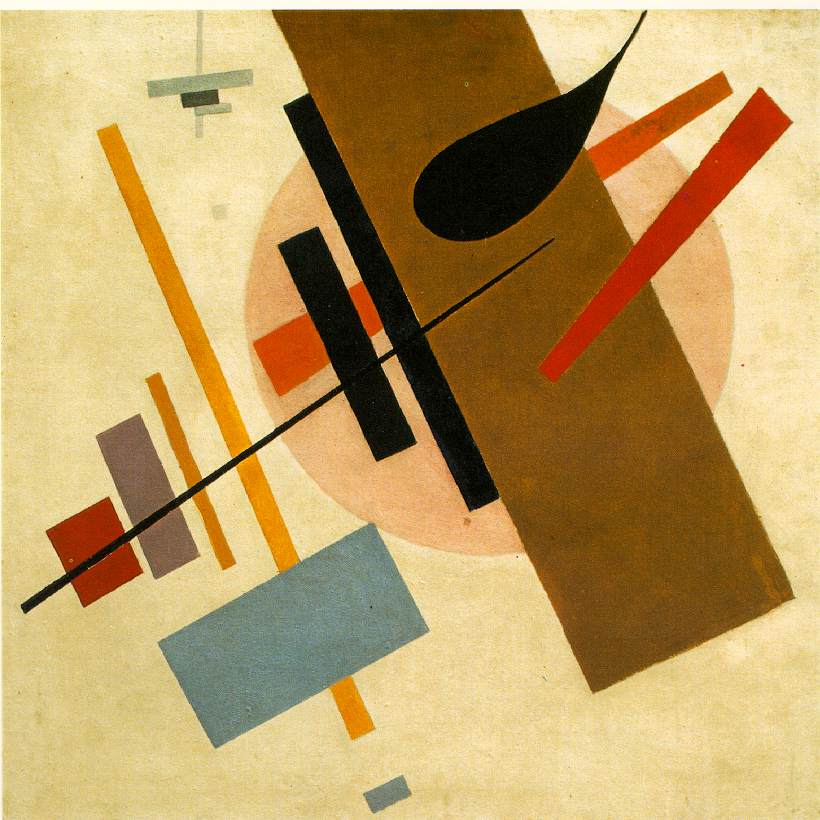
Kazimir Malevich, (Supremus No. 58), Museum of Art, 1916, Suprematism

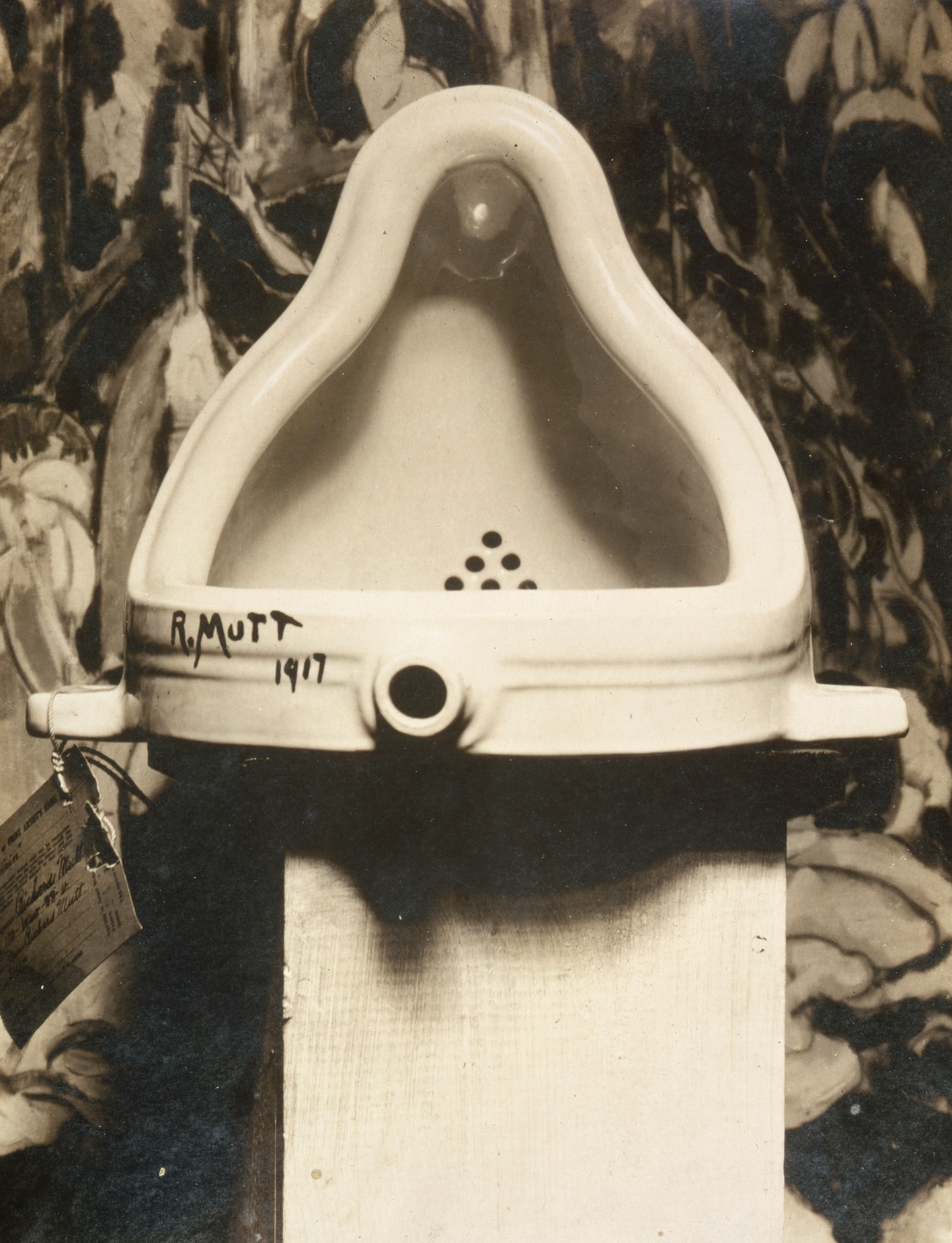
Marcel Duchamp, Fountain, 1917, photograph by Alfred Stieglitz, Dada

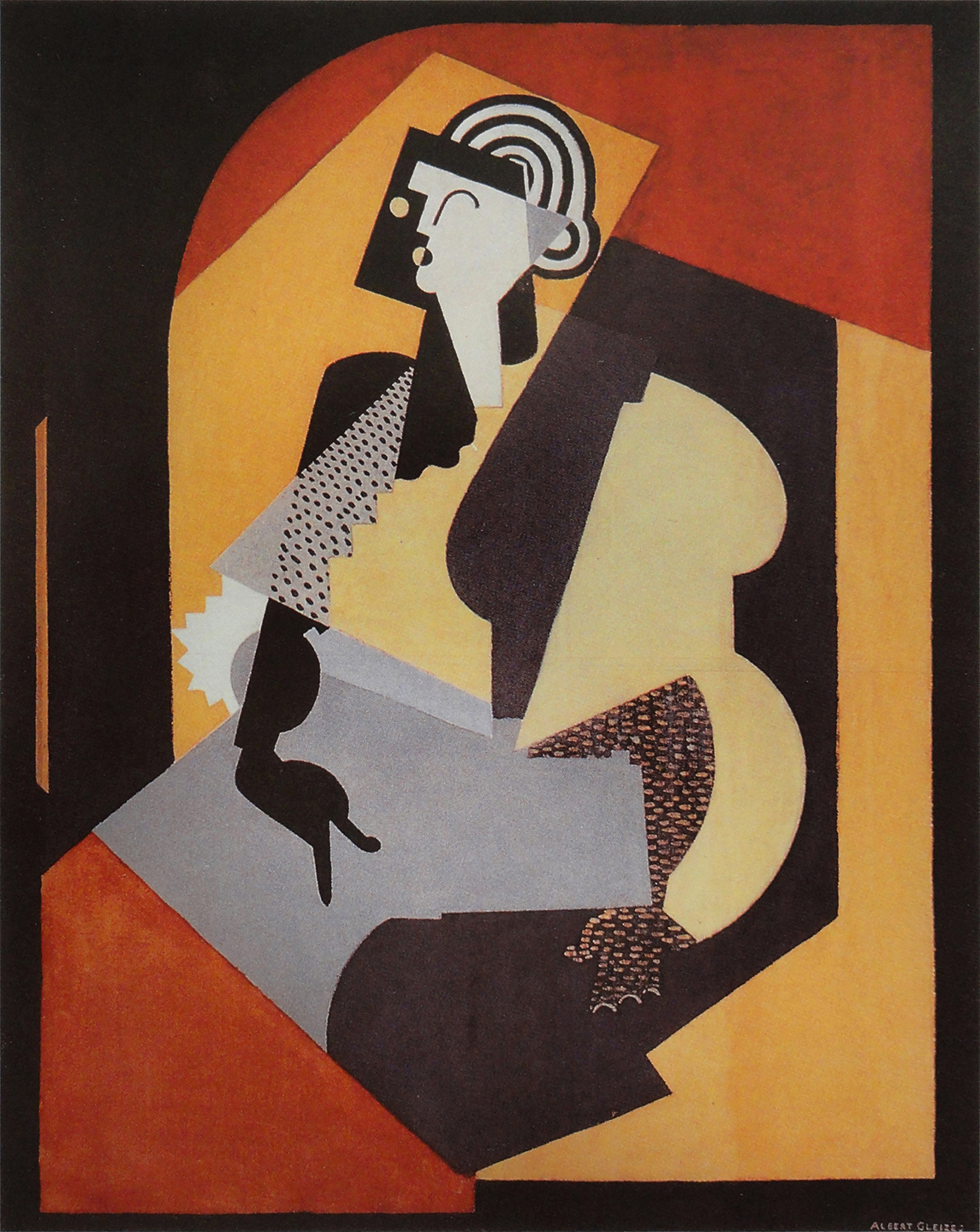
Albert Gleizes, Woman with Black Glove, 1920, Crystal Cubism

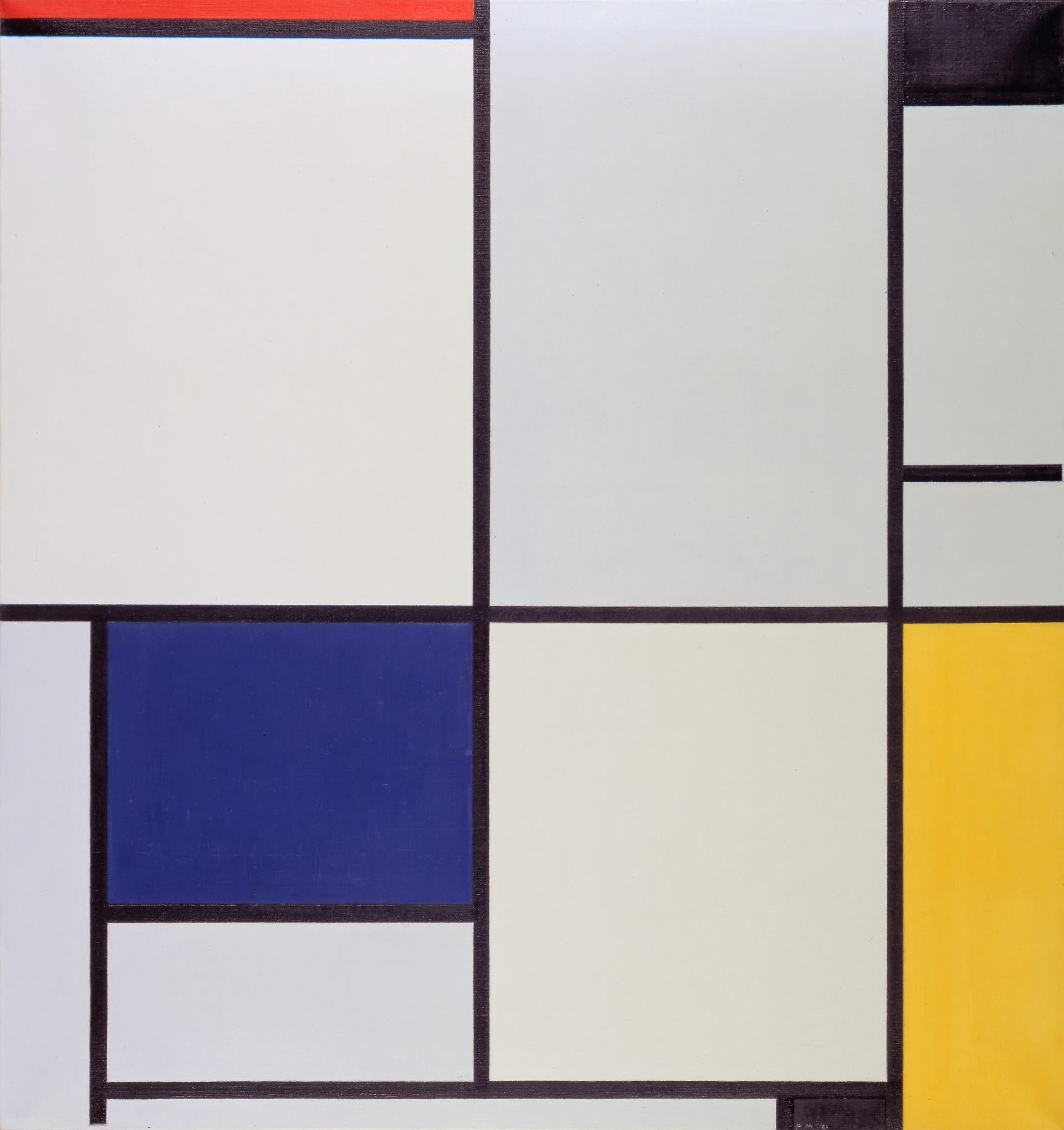
Piet Mondrian, Tableau I, 1921, De Stijl
- Academic, c. 1900s (decade)-ongoing
- American realism, c. 1890s–1920s
- Analytic Cubism, c. 1909–1912
- Art Deco, c. 1910–1939
- Ashcan School, c. 1890s–1920s
- Australian tonalism, c. 1910s–1930s
- Berliner Sezession, founded 1898
- Bloomsbury Group, c. 1900s (decade)–1960s
- Brandywine School
- Camden Town Group, c. 1911–1913
- Constructivism, c. 1920–1922, 1920s–1940s
- Cubism, c. 1906–1919
- Cubo-Futurism, c. 1912–1918
- Czech Cubism, c. 1910–1914
- Dada, c. 1916–1922
- Der Blaue Reiter, c. 1911–1914
- De Stijl, c. 1917–1931
- Deutscher Werkbund, founded 1907
- Die Brücke, founded 1905
- Expressionism, c. 1890s–1930s
- Fauvism, c. 1900–1910
- Futurism, c. 1909–1916
- German Expressionism, c. 1913–1930
- Group of Seven (Canada), c. 1913–1930s
- Jack of Diamonds, founded 1909
- Luminism (Impressionism), c. 1900s (decade)–1930s
- Modernism, c. 1860s–ongoing
- Neo-classicism, c. 1900s (decade)–ongoing
- Neo-primitivism, from 1913
- Neue Künstlervereinigung München
- Novembergruppe, founded 1918
- Objective abstraction, c. 1933–1936
- Orphism, c. 1910–1913
- Photo-Secession, founded c. 1902
- Pittura Metafisica, c. 1911–1920
- Proto-Cubism, c. 1906–1908
- Purism, c. 1917–1930s
- Rayonism
- Section d'Or, c. 1912–1914
- Suprematism, formed c. 1915–1916
- Synchromism, founded 1912
- Synthetic Cubism, c. 1912–1919
- The Eight, c. 1909–1918
- The Ten, c. 1897–1920
- Vorticism, founded 1914

=== 1920–1945 ===
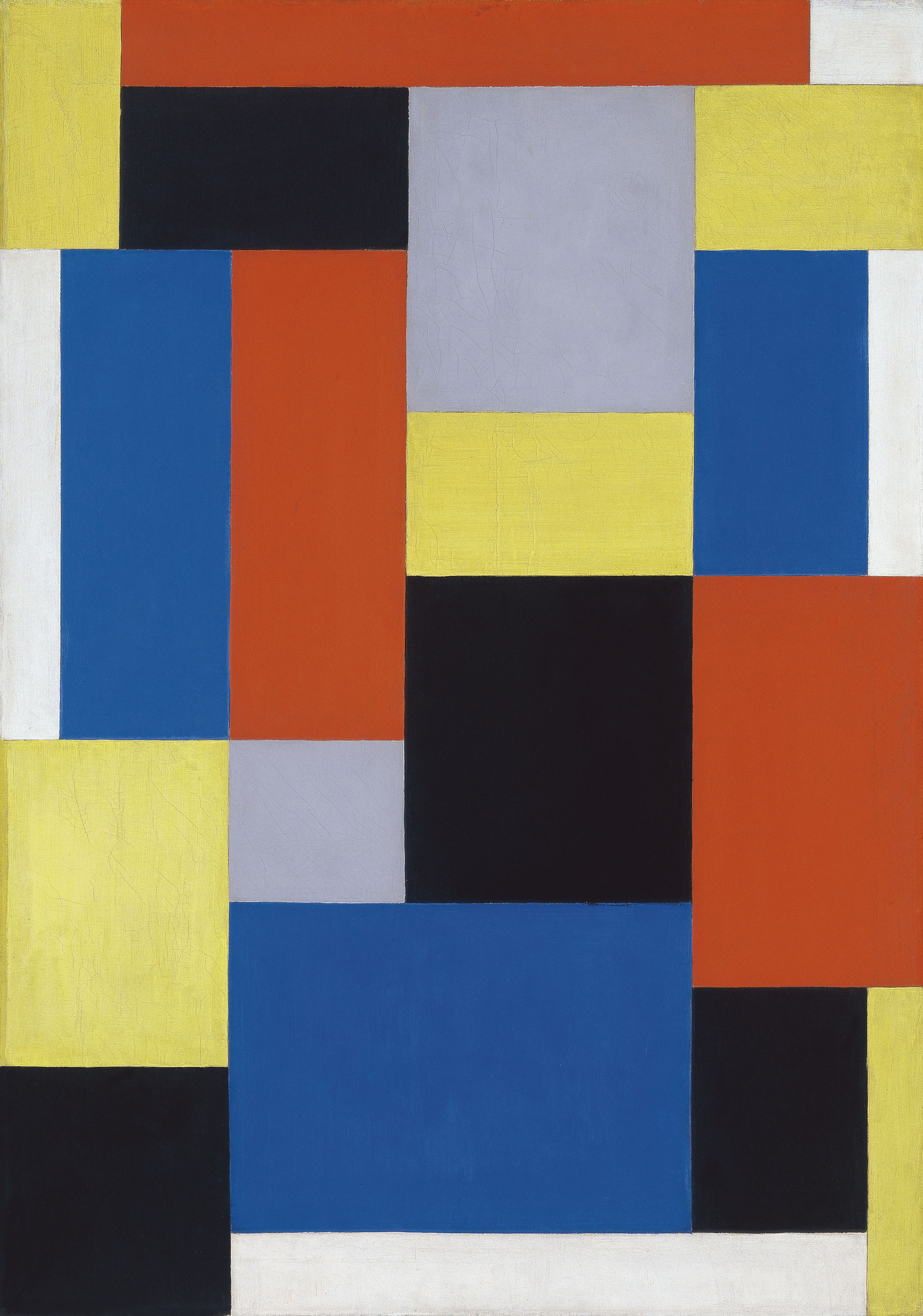
Theo van Doesburg, Composition XX, 1920, De Stijl

Max Ernst, The Elephant Celebes, 1921, Tate, Surrealism

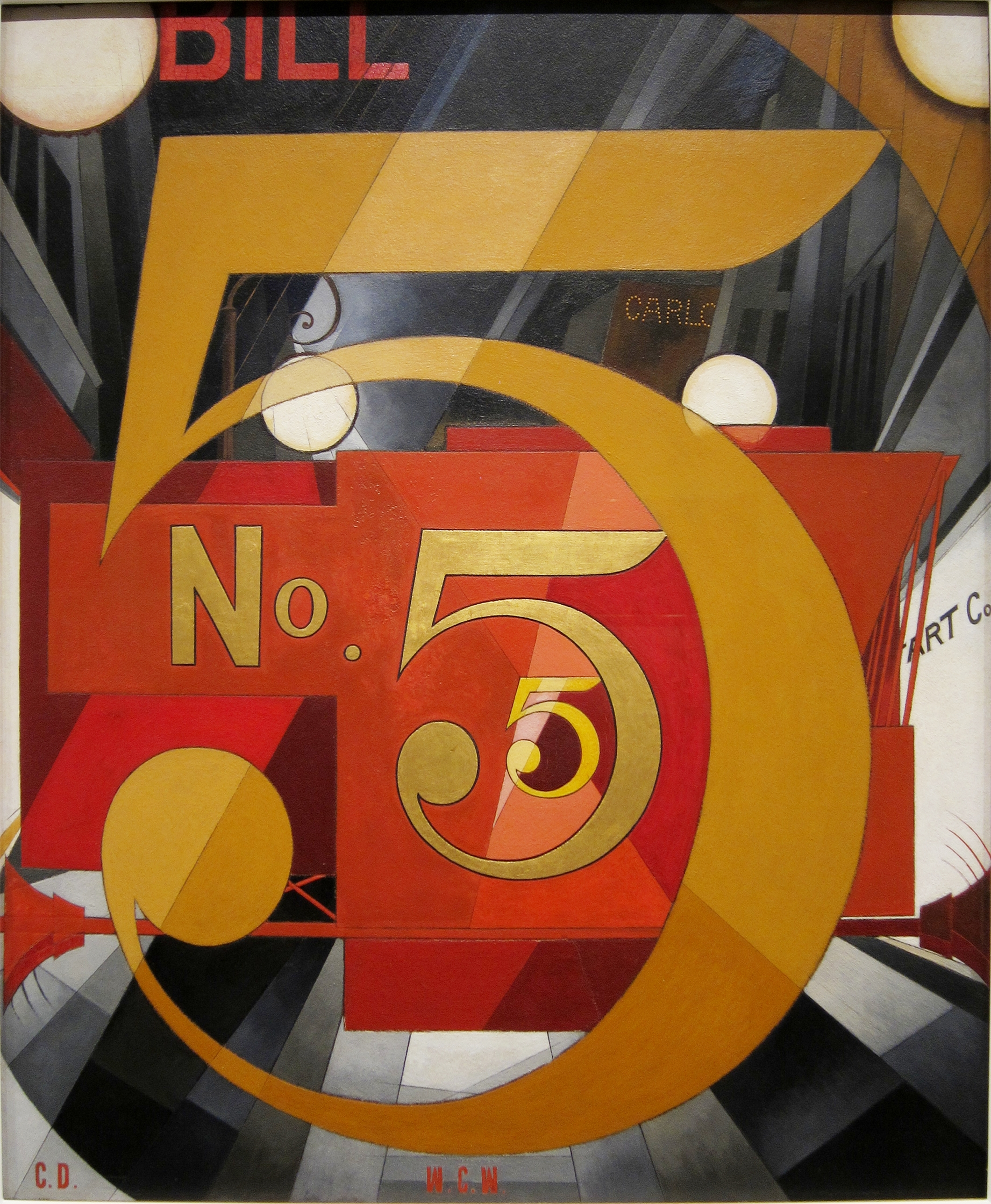
Charles Demuth, I Saw the Figure 5 in Gold, 1928, Metropolitan Museum of Art, Precisionism

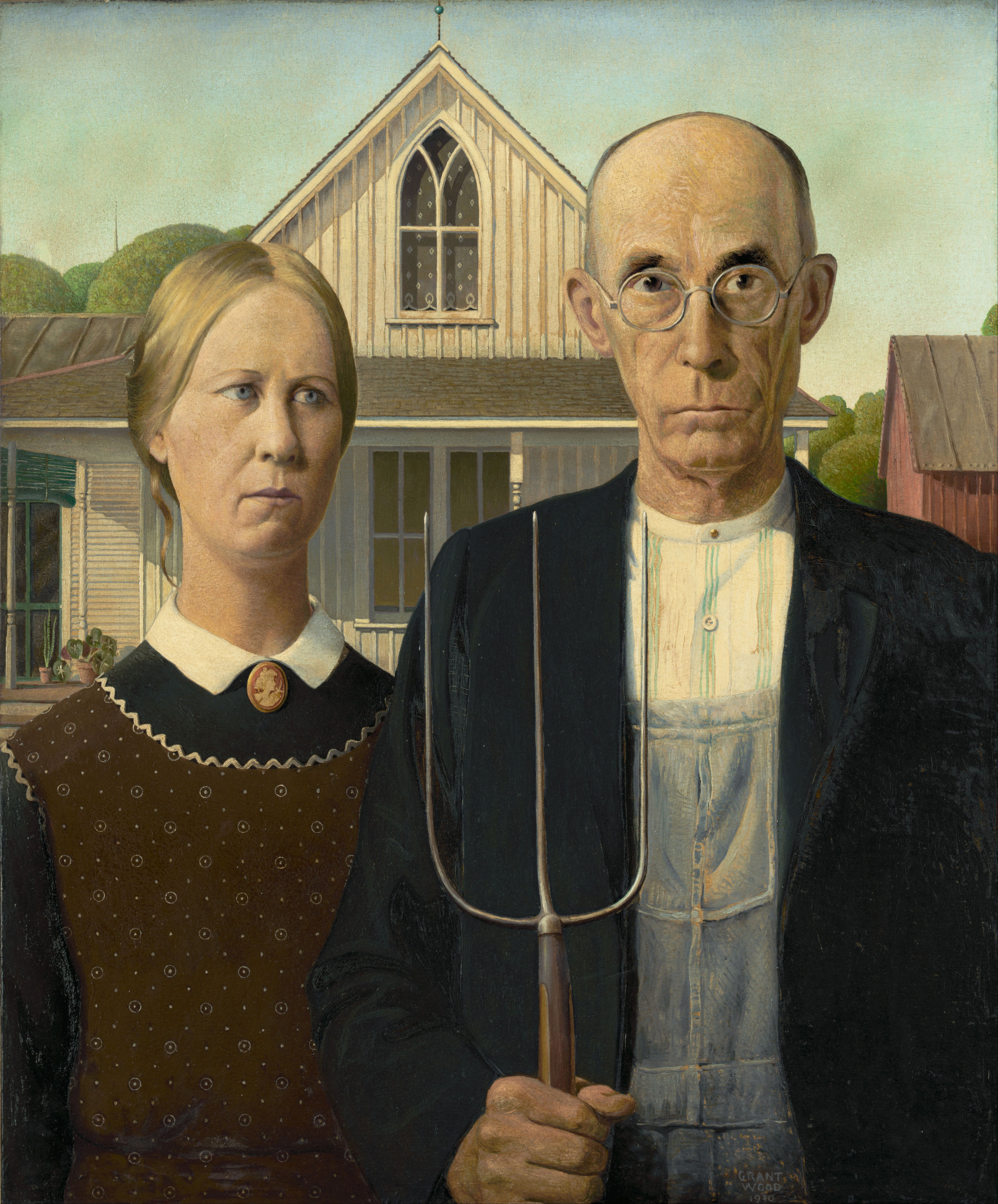
Grant Wood, American Gothic, 1930, Art Institute of Chicago, Social Realism
- American Scene painting, c. 1920s–1950s
- Arbeitsrat für Kunst
- Art Deco
- Bauhaus, c. 1919–1933
- Concrete art
- Der Ring
- De Stijl, c. 1917–1931
- École de Paris
- Geometric abstraction
- Gruppo 7
- International Style, c. 1920s–1970s
- Kapists, c. 1930s
- Magic realism
- Neo-romanticism
- Neue Sachlichkeit
- Novecento Italiano
- Novembergruppe, founded 1918
- Os renovadores, founded 1922
- Precisionism, c. 1918–1940s
- Regionalism (art), c. 1930s–1940s
- Return to order, 1918–1922
- Scuola Romana, c. 1928–1945
- Social Realism, c. 1920s–1960s
- Socialist Realism
- Surrealism, c. 1920s–1960s
- Universal Constructivism, c. 1930–1970

=== 1940–1965 ===
Arshile Gorky, The Liver Is the Cock's Comb (1944), oil on canvas, 73 1/4 × 98" (186 × 249 cm) Albright–Knox Art Gallery, Buffalo, New York. Gorky was an Armenian-born American painter who had a seminal influence on Abstract Expressionism. De Kooning said: "I met a lot of artists — but then I met Gorky... He had an extraordinary gift for hitting the nail on the head; remarkable. So I immediately attached myself to him and we became very good friends."

- Abstract expressionism
- Action painting
- Arte Povera
- Art Informel
- Assemblage
- Bay Area Figuration
- Beatnik art
- Chicago Imagists
- CoBrA, c. 1948–1951
- Color Field painting
- Combine painting
- De-collage
- Fluxus
- Happening
- Hard-Edge Painting
- Kinetic Art
- Kitchen Sink School
- Lettrism
- Lyrical abstraction
- Neo-Dada
- New Brutalism
- Northwest School
- Nouveau Réalisme
- Op Art
- Organic abstraction
- Outsider Art
- Panic Movement
- Pop Art
- Post-painterly abstraction
- Process art
- Public art
- Retro art
- Serial art
- Shaped canvas
- Situationist International
- Tachism
- Video art

=== 1965–2000 ===
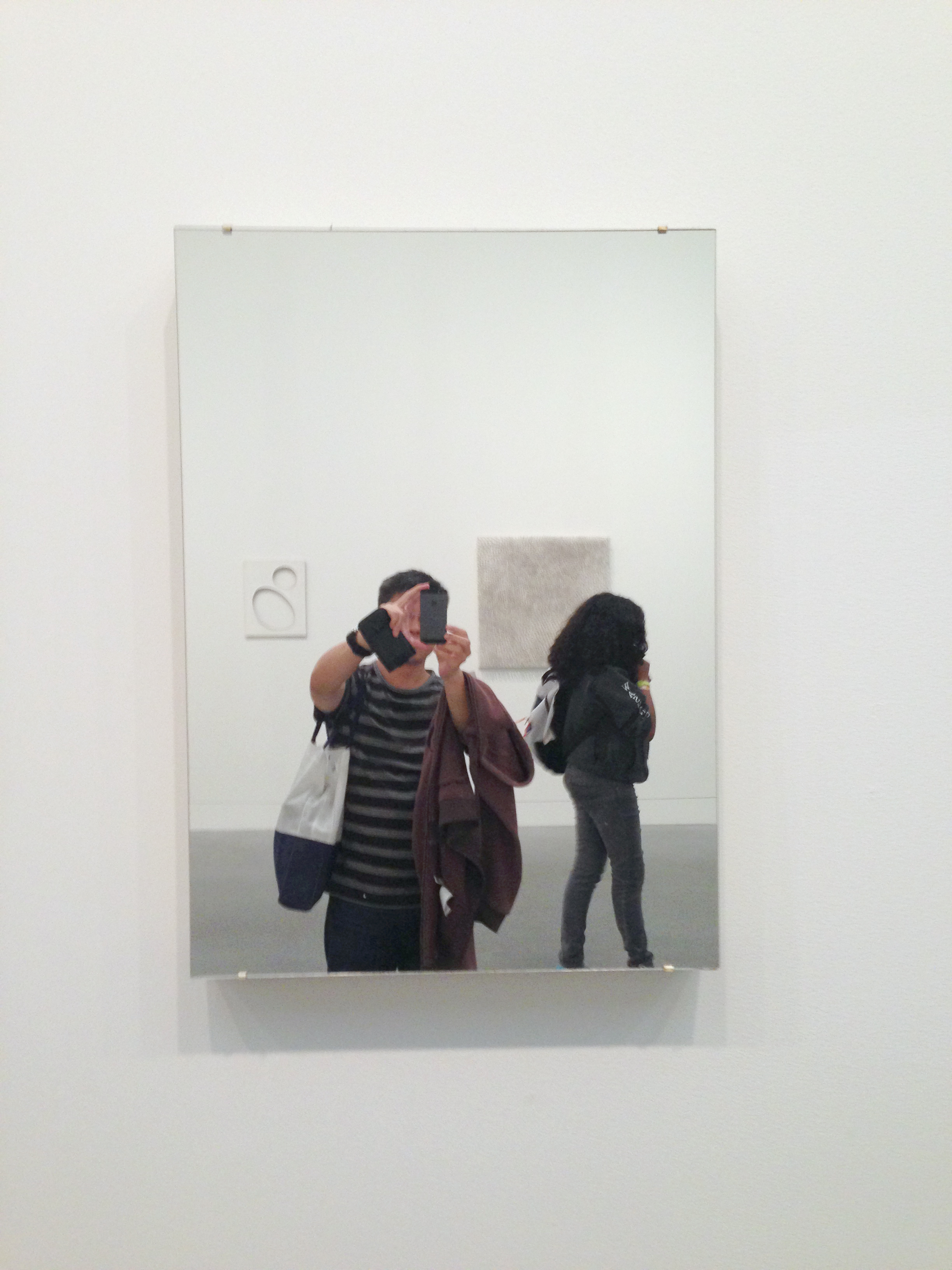
Art & Language, Untitled Painting (1965), Tate, Conceptual art

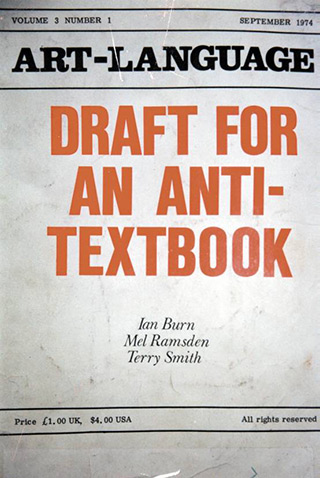
Art & Language, Art-Language Vol.3 No.1 (1974), Château de Montsoreau-Museum of Contemporary Art, Conceptual art

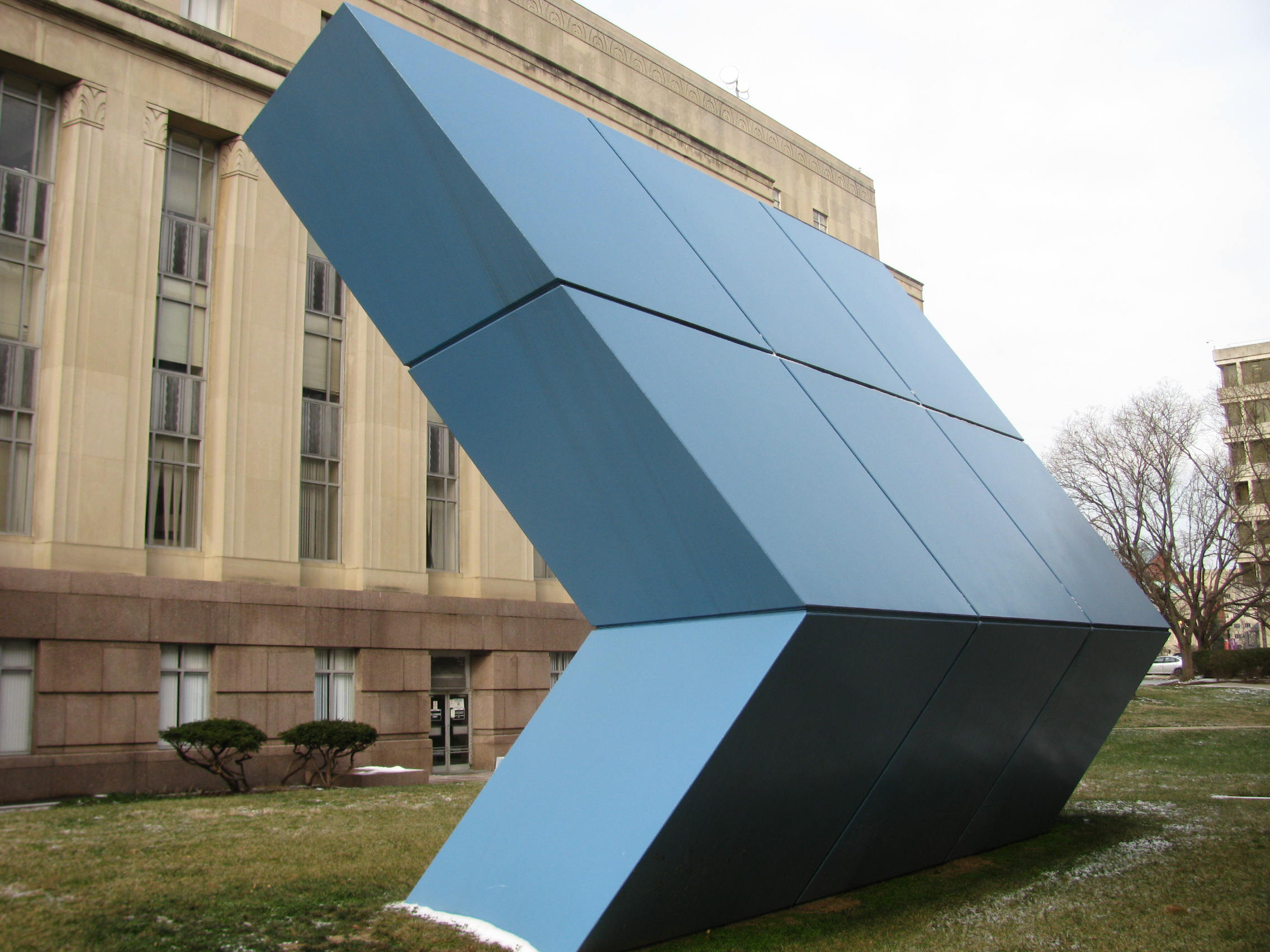
Tony Smith, She Who Must Be Obeyed, 1975, Tony Smith Department of Labour Building, Minimalism

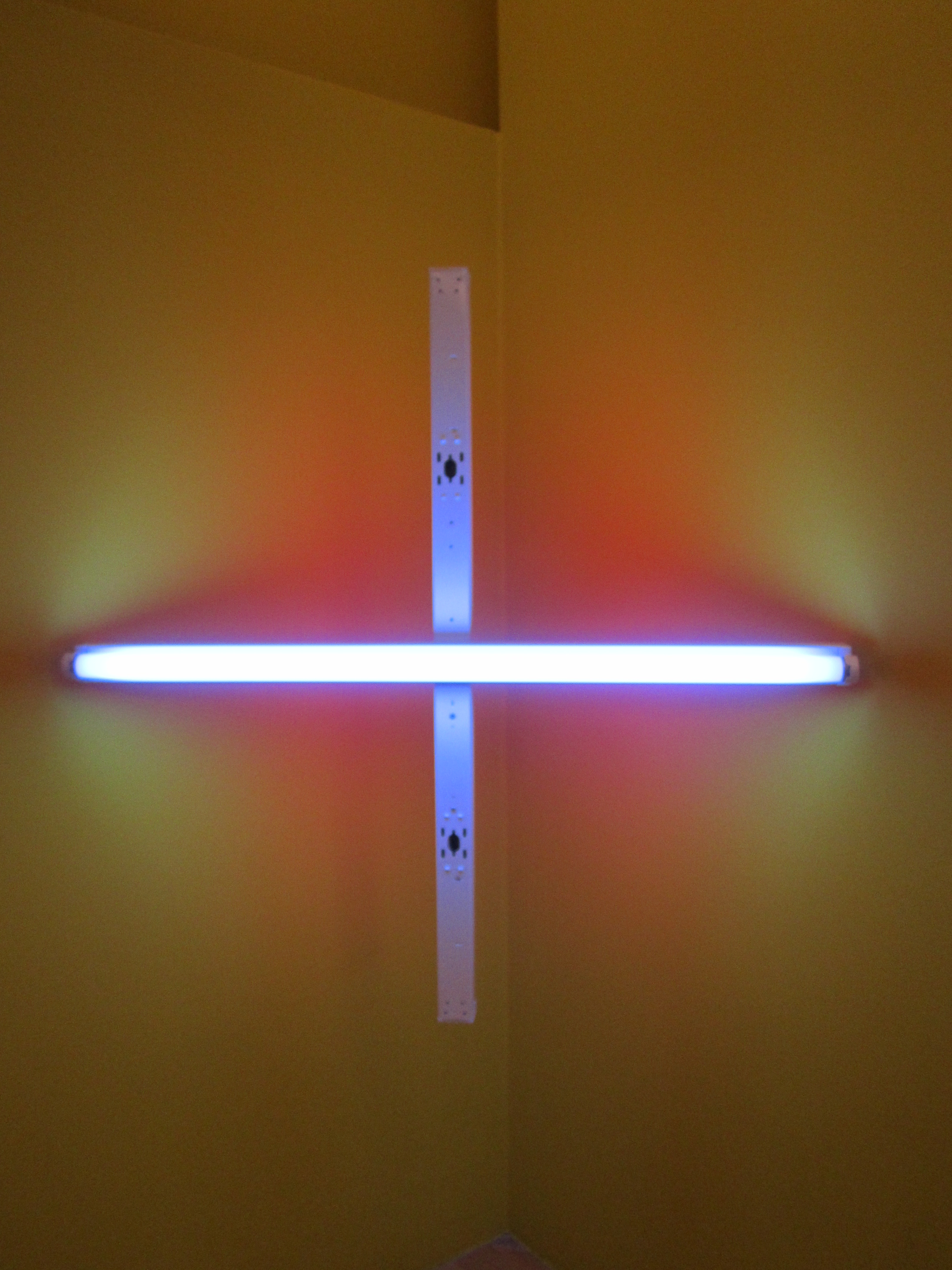
Dan Flavin, Untitled (Corner Piece), 1930, Tate Liverpool, Installation art
- Abstract Illusionism
- Appropriation
- Arte Povera
- Art Photography
- Body Art
- Classical Realism
- Conceptual Art
- Dogme 95
- Earth Art
- Figuration Libre
- Funk art
- Graffiti art
- Hyperrealism
- Installation art
- Internet Art
- Land art
- Late modernism
- Light and Space
- Lowbrow
- Lyrical Abstraction
- Mail art
- Massurrealism
- Maximalism
- Minimalism
- Neo-expressionism
- Neo-figurative
- Neo-pop
- Performance Art
- Postminimalism
- Postmodernism
- Photorealism
- Psychedelic art
- Relational art
- Site-specific art
- Sound Art
- Transavanguardia
- Young British Artists

== 21st century ==
- Algorithmic art
- Altermodernism
- Artificial intelligence art
- Biomorphism
- Computer art
- Computer graphics
- Craftivism
- Digital art
- Electronic art
- Environmental art
- Excessivism
- Internet art
- Intervention art
- Metamodernism
- Modern European ink painting
- Neo-minimalism
- New media art
- Pixel art
- Postinternet
- Post-postmodernism
- Relational art
- Remodernism
- Social practice (art)
- SoFlo Superflat
- Stuckism International
- Superflat
- Superstroke
- Transgressive art
- Toyism
- Vaporwave

== See also ==
- 20th-century Western painting
- Art periods
- List of art movements
- Post-expressionism
- Western art history
