= Machino (rural locality) =

Machino (Russian: Мачино) is the name of several rural localities in Russia:

- Machino, Krasnoyarsk Krai, a village in Berezovsky Selsoviet of Abansky District of Krasnoyarsk Krai
- Machino, Klyapovskoye Rural Settlement, a village in Beryozovsky District of Perm Krai; municipally, a part of Klyapovskoye Rural Settlement of that district
- Machino, Beryozovsky District, a village in Beryozovsky District of Perm Krai; municipally, a part of Beryozovskoye Rural Settlement of that district
