= Conrad Bo =

South African artist

Michiel Conrad Botha (born 9 August 1972), better known as Conrad Bo, is a South African artist and the founder of the Superstroke art movement.

He was born in Pretoria, South Africa, but grew up in Witbank, about 100 kilometers from Pretoria, where he attended primary and high school. He studied at the University of Johannesburg, where he obtained a B.Com. degree. After working for several corporate companies. he devoted himself full-time to art in 2002.

He has participated in several group and solo exhibitions in various places all over South Africa and is the founding member of the Superstroke art movement, which is still active in South Africa and various other counties. The Superstroke art movement is one of the few art movements that exist in Africa and is only preceded by Fook Island, an art movement founded by the artist Walter Battiss.

The Superstroke art movement is a direct decedent of the concept of generalism, and according to Bo, it is also greatly influenced by the superflat, the Japanese art movement founded by Takashi Murakami.
