= Bome =

Bome may refer to:

- Bome (sculptor), Japanese sculptor
- Bomê County, county in Tibet
