= Superflat =

Art movement

Superflat is a postmodern art movement, founded by Japanese contemporary artist Takashi Murakami, which is influenced by manga and anime. However, superflat does not have an explicit definition because Takashi Murakami does not want to limit the movement, but rather leave room for it to grow and evolve over time.

Superflat is also the name of a 2000 art exhibition, curated by Murakami, that toured West Hollywood, Minneapolis and Seattle.

== Description ==
"Superflat" is used by Murakami to refer to various flattened forms in Japanese graphic art, animation, pop culture and fine arts, as well as the "shallow emptiness of Japanese consumer culture." Superflat has been embraced by American artists, who have created a hybrid called "SoFlo Superflat".

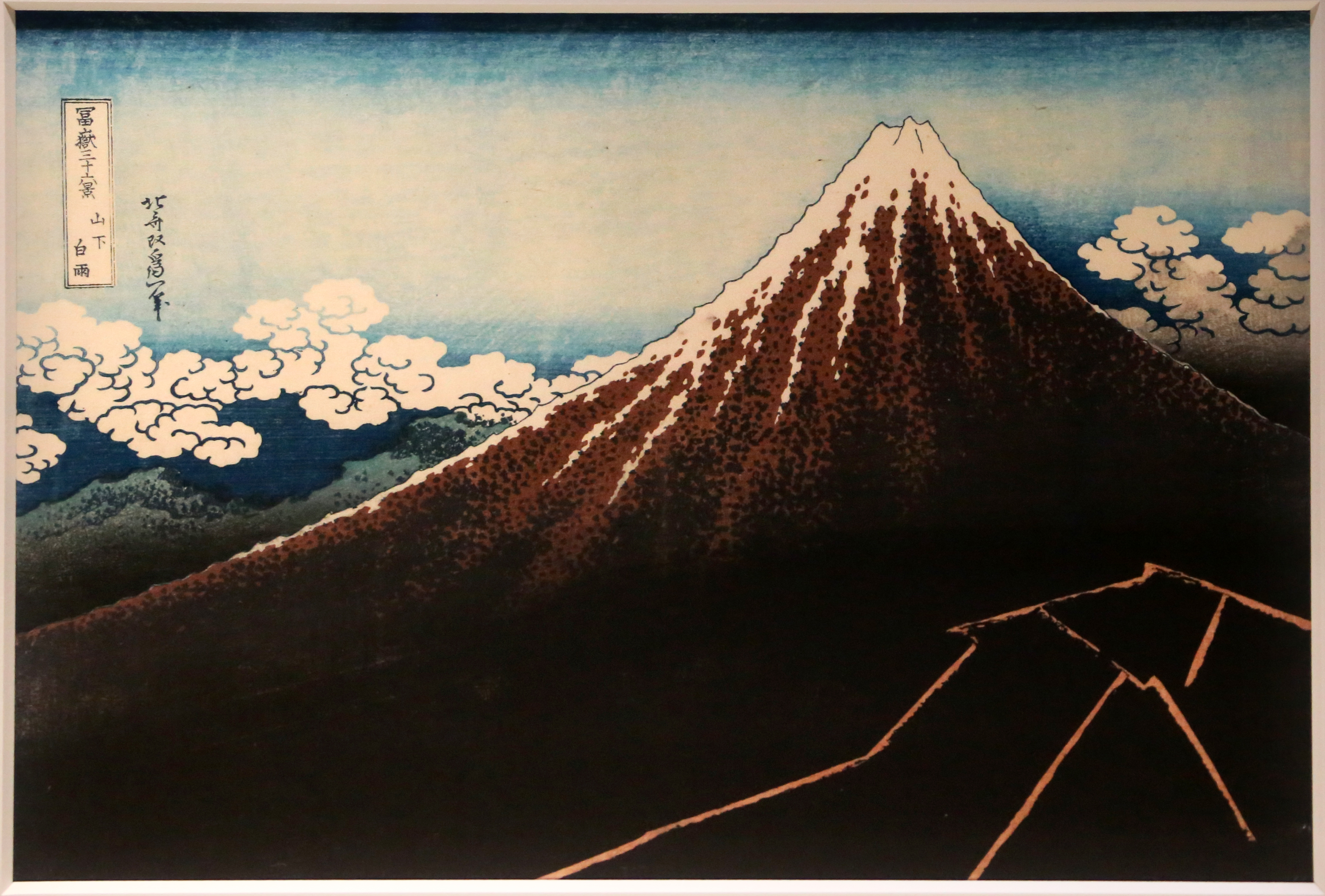
Takashi Murakami described Hokusai's "Thunderstorm Beneath the Summit" as an example of a Superflat art piece.

Murakami defines Superflat in broad terms, so the subject matter is very diverse. Some works explore the consumerism and sexual fetishism that is prevalent in post-war Japanese culture. This often includes lolicon art, which is parodied by works such as those by Henmaru Machino. These works are an exploration of otaku sexuality through grotesque and/or distorted images. Other works are more concerned with a fear of growing up. For example, Yoshitomo Nara's work often features playful graffiti on old Japanese ukiyo-e executed in a childish manner. And some works focus on the structure and underlying desires that comprise otaku and overall post-war Japanese culture. Murakami is influenced by directors such as Hideaki Anno.

Superflat is not limited to contemporary art alone. Murakami cites older Japanese pieces as superflat as well, including Katsushika Hokusai's "Thunderstorm Beneath the Summit" (1830–32) as an example of superflat.

A subversive look at otakuism is not a defining factor of Kaikai Kiki's galleries; Bome, one of the most important artists involved with the first Superflat exhibition, is a famous otaku figure sculptor and his work based on existing bishōjo anime characters has been showcased in multiple galleries including a solo exhibition in the Kaikai Kiki Gallery. The artist Mr. is a self-described lolicon and views his artwork to be not a cultural commentary but a portrayal of his own personal fantasies.

== Artists ==
Superflat artists include Chiho Aoshima, Keiichi Tanaami, Ayako Rokkaku, Mahomi Kunikata, Sayuri Michima, Yoshitomo Nara, Yuko Yamaguchi, Aya Takano, Yusuke Nakamura, Tomokazu Matsuyama, Sebastian Masuda, Fantasista Utamaro,Takashi Murakami and Simon Basher In addition, some animators within anime and some manga artists have had their past and present work exhibited in Superflat exhibitions, especially Kōji Morimoto, Keita Takahashi, Seizō Watase, Seiichi Hayashi, Hibiki Yoshizaki, and the work of Hitoshi Tomizawa, author of Alien 9 and Milk Closet.

== Origins ==
There are multiple factors that played a role for Murakami to come up with his Superflat claim. In his Manifesto, he describes “Super flatness” as an original concept of Japanese who have been completely Westernized, that simultaneously links the past with the present and the future.

The past, in this case, refers to art made during the Edo period in Japan, where Murakami finds his foremost inspiration in the works of Fine Art painters such as Kano Sansetsu, Ito Jakuchu, Soga Shohaku and Katsushika Hokusai. Murakami explains that his theory was born from a hypothesis created by art historian Nobuo Tsuji in his book The Lineage of Eccentricity.

In his book, Tsuji critically analyses works from Edo period painters and explains how the picture controls the speed and course of its observer's gaze, creating an interaction between the surface and the viewer with a zigzag motion. This is further elaborated in Takashi Murakami: Lineage of Eccentrics, a book that presents key examples of Murakami's work alongside a selection of Japanese masterpieces arranged according to the concepts laid out by Tsuji himself. It is mentioned that the juxtaposition of foreground forms extending horizontally across broad compositions and two-dimensional surfaces is another feature that Murakami has adapted for his own theory and contemporary subject matter.

The particular sensibility of the gaze and inspiration from old masters is what Murakami continues to incorporate in his own works. An example of this is his painting called 727, a work made with acrylics on three panels. In the middle is his alter ego depicted, also known as 'Mr. DOB', riding a stylized wave that is a direct reference to Hokusai's famous Great Wave off Kanagawa. The panels on which it was painted show a resemblance to the flat and often 'blank' backgrounds characterizing in Nihonga paintings and folding screens, illustrating features of Superflatness.

Another field within the arts that, according to both Murakami and Tsuji, is closely related to eccentricity of traditional Japanese art and also carries Superflat features, is animation. In his manifesto, Murakami takes Yoshinori Kanada as a prime example of an animator whose work contains a compositional dynamic that resembles that of the "eccentric" artists to a startling degree.

A connection can be made of modern-day animation back to twelfth- and thirteenth-century Japanese handscrolls, where the narrative is composed across multiple sheets of joined paper, read from right to left, providing the observer once again a two-dimensional 'flat' space and composition where the gaze leads the viewer through the story.

A different factor that played a role for the emergence of Superflatness was the bursting bubble of the Japanese economy in the 1990s, where Japan was led into uncertain territory and a loss of its sense of security. Michael Darling explains that "rabid consumerism and the slavish following of fads, especially in fashion, have further contributed to a culture of surfaces and superficiality, representing still another facet of the Superflat concept". Darling, 2001). He uses photography and fashion as further examples to illustrate Superflatness and the hype and high consumer demand of Japan.

== See also ==
- Hiropon (sculpture)
- My Lonesome Cowboy
- Nijikon
