= SoFlo Superflat =

Art movement originating in Miami, USA

SoFlo Superflat describes an art genre started in Miami in the 1990s. It is an urban pop art movement in South Florida that combines super bright colors and ultra flat images. The subject matters are very diverse. It is an outcrop of the Japanese Superflat movement, founded by the artist Takashi Murakami.

== Description ==
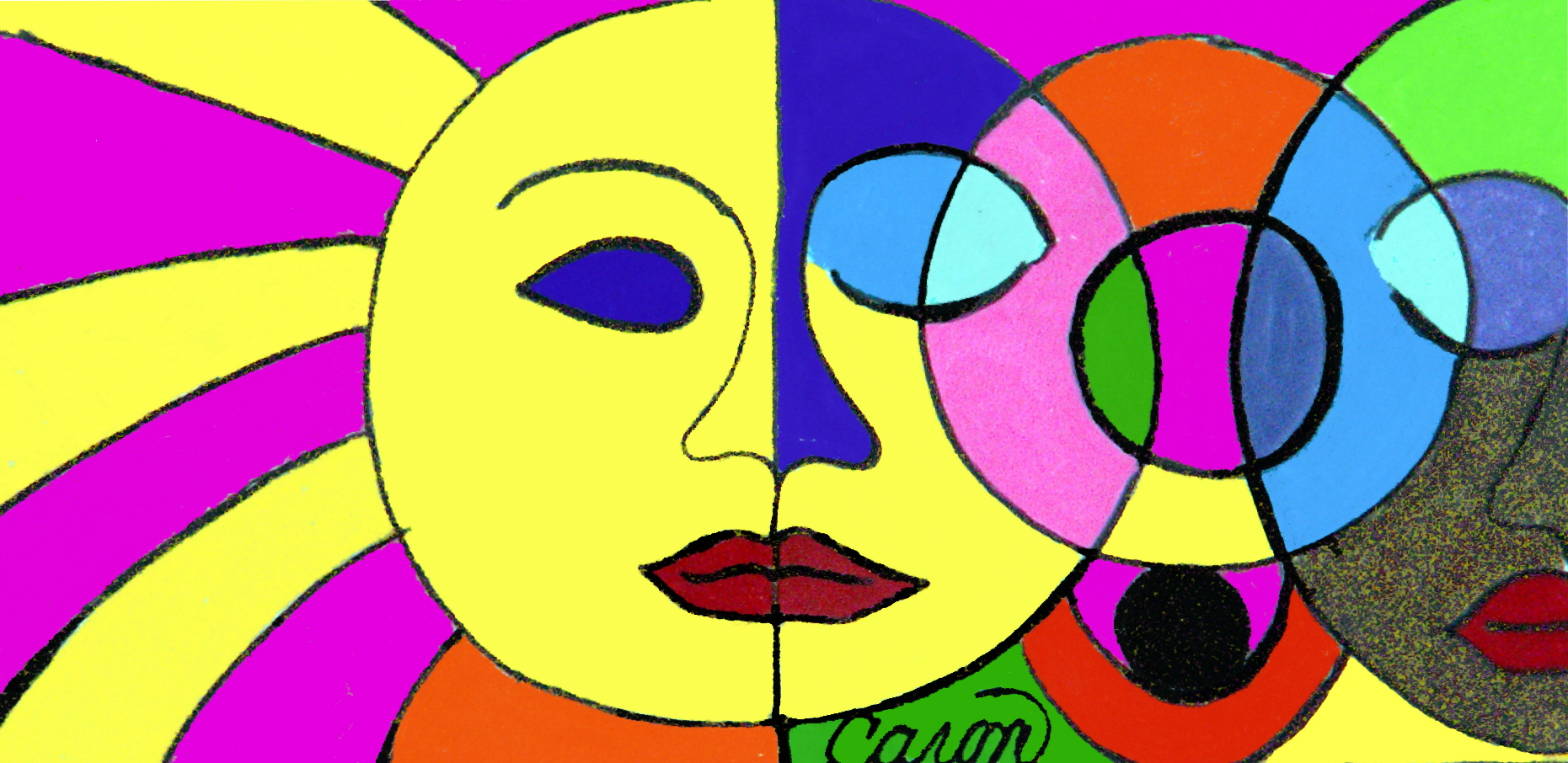
Sunshine and Moon Caron Bowman, 40x60, Pastel, Example of SoFlo Superflat art

These artists emphasize outlines and flat areas of color. What is important is the feeling of flatness. Many of the artists involved in SoFlo Superflat art believe that the culture in SoFlo is not three-dimensional; therefore, it can be better interpreted in very flat brightly colored two-dimensional images. SoFlo Superflat was born out of the compression of genres which is shown through the pop-infected work of younger artists. The artists in this genre have very specific styles that can be best described as a consistent pictorial language. Repetition of images and pattern is used create a signature look. For example, Britto's "squiggle lines" and geometric patterns are consistent themes in his work. Artists whose work is regarded as "SoFlo Superflat" include: Britto, Caron Bowman, Raul Cremata, Ceron, Ed King, and Jose Alvares.
