= Kaiyodo =

Japanese toy company

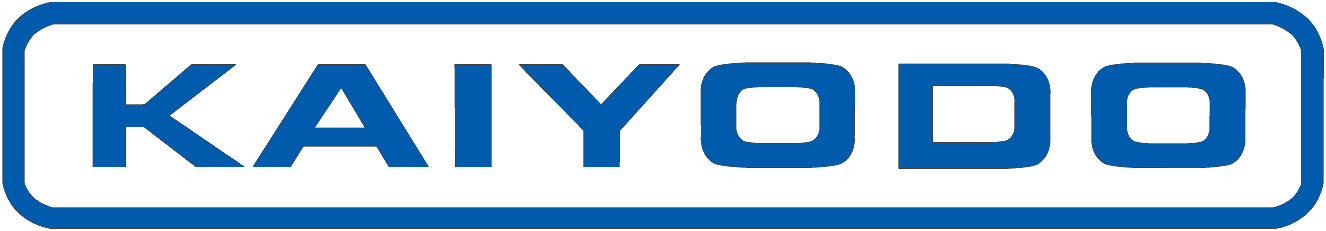

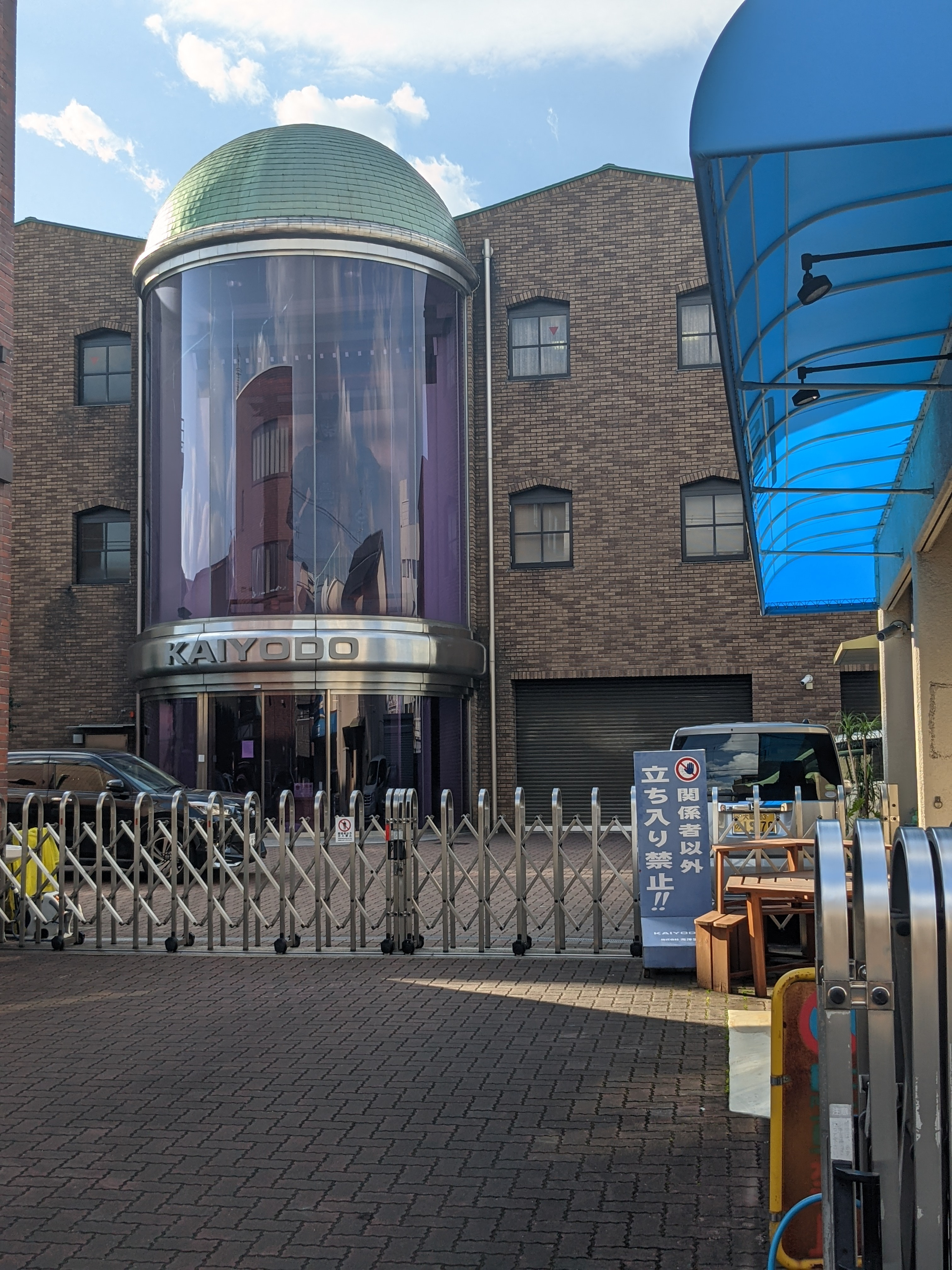
- Kaiyodo headquarters as seen in 2021
- Native name: 海洋堂
- Type: Gōdō gaisha
- Industry: Entertainment
- Founded: April 1, 1964; 62 years ago
- Founder: Osamu Miyawaki
- Headquarters: Moriguchi, Osaka, Japan
- Key people: Shuichi Miyawaki (CEO)
- Products: Figurines, garage kits
- Revenue: ¥2.3 billion
- Total assets: ¥20 million
- Number of employees: 41
- Website: kaiyodo.co.jp

Kaiyodo (海洋堂, Kaiyōdō) is a Japanese company which manufactures figurines and garage kits. Its headquarters is in Kadoma, Osaka Prefecture. While the company mostly focuses on anime-related characters, it recently has acquired other licenses, e.g. dc comics, along with other licenses spanning throughout many fandoms.

Kaiyodo was originally a small shop in Japan, but grew into a famous company over the years, leading them to sell collectables worldwide. One of their most famous sculptors is Bome, who is most well known for his Mon-sieur BOME collection. In recent years, his figurines have become well known and sought by collectors, and his works have been displayed on a worldwide scale at conventions, including Paris, Tokyo etc.

== Product lines ==
Revoltech (リボルテック, Riborutekku) is a portmanteau for "Revolver Technology", in reference to the unique "Revolver Joint" articulation which all of the figures in this particular series utilize. This gives the figures a wide range of motion and stability, allowing for many dynamic and varied poses.

The subject matter for the Revoltech line can be broadly split into four categories: Real Robot, Super Robot, Humanoid and Creature. Thus far, robots and characters from anime, video games, manga, tokusatsu, film, television, audio drama and music have been covered. The revolver joint is composed of three pieces, two half spheres whose flat sections provide the friction surface for the articulation, and a cross section pin that locks the whole assembly into place. Both half-spheres have round cylindrical pegs used to connect the different body parts of any given figure.

== Licenses ==
- DC Comics Amazing Yamaguchi series
  - Joker
  - Harley Quinn
  - Superman
  - Flash
  - Reverse Flash
  - Batman
  - Supergirl
  - Catwoman
  - Nightwing
  - Deathstroke
  - Wonder Woman
  - Batman Beyond
  - Deadshot
  - Black Flash
- Marvel
  - Iron Spider
  - Winter Soldier
  - Spider-Man
  - Symbiote Spider-Man
  - Wolverine
  - Deadpool
  - Thor
  - Magneto
  - Spider-Gwen
  - Gwenom
  - Gambit
  - Psylocke
  - Black Panther
  - Venom
  - Carnage
  - Cable
  - Captain America
  - Iron Man
  - War Machine
  - Moon Knight
  - Agent Venom
- My Hero Academia
  - Izuku Midoriya
  - Katsuki Bakugo
  - All Might
  - Ochaco Uraraka
  - Shoto Todoroki
  - Dabi
  - Hawks
  - Tomura Shigaraki
  - Mirko
  - Shota Aizawa
  - Himiko Toga
- Attack on Titan
  - Eren Yeager
  - Armored Titan
  - Female Titan
  - Beast Titan
- One-Punch Man
  - Saitama
  - Genos
  - Bang
  - Boros
  - Puri-Puri Prisoner
  - Garou
- Dandadan
  - Okarun
  - Evil Eye
- Street Fighter 6
  - Ryu
  - Chun-Li
  - Luke Sullivan
  - Juri Han
- Tolmekian Soldier Figures
