= Chiho Aoshima =

Japanese artist (born 1974)

- 青島千穂
- Born: 1974 (age 51–52); Tokyo, Japan
- Education: Hosei University 1995
- Known for: Film and Video Art, Sculpture, Print, New Media, Mixed Media
- Notable work: City Glow
- Movement: Superflat

Chiho Aoshima (青島千穂; born 1974 in Tokyo, Japan) is a Japanese pop artist and a member of Takashi Murakami's Kaikai Kiki Collective. Aoshima graduated from the Department of Economics, Hosei University, Tokyo. She held an artist residency at Artpace, San Antonio, United States in 2006.

== Personal life ==
Aoshima was unhappy while studying economics at Hosei University. In an interview with Saatchi Art Aoshima admitted that, "I was bored to death, even when I was hanging out with my friends. I was eager to create something but didn’t know what to create, every day time passed so slowly and I felt like I was going to die." She taught herself how to use Adobe Illustrator and began to fall in love with the medium. After participating in her first show, Murakami's Tokyo Girls Bravo, she began to work in Murakami's factory.

Aoshima was one of the first 3 interns under Murakami at the Kaikai Kiki Art Collective. She oversaw the design data for Murakami’s art pieces and introduced him to programs like Adobe Illustrator.

== Art Style and Process ==
Aoshima is well known for using Bezier curves in Adobe Illustrator which has garnered her popularity. By using Bezier curves Aoshima's works can be infinitely scaled. Aoshima mostly prints large scale images onto papers with heavy-duty printers, but she has also printed on materials such as leather and plastic surfaces to give her images different textures.

Aoshima also works in sculpture and animation, her largest image yet is from her City Glow Series. She displayed this work in an exhibition on a disused platform of the Gloucester Road tube station in London during 2006 and at the 14th Street – Union Square subway station in New York City. It measures 32.5 meters in length and 4.8 meters in height.

== Themes ==
Aoshima's work often involves surreal scenes and dreamscapes, often including ghosts, demons, nature and shōjo. Her work also features contrasting themes such as nature and civilization, creation and destruction and life and death. Aoshima depicts things such as skulls as content and resting with nature blooming out of it as opposed to their more nightmarish forms given by artists like Kuniyoshi.

Additionally Aoshima has admitted to some of the depictions of young girls in her art being avatars of herself. These avatars act as a way for Aoshima to express some of her own discomfort in the real world, and her vulnerabilities.

== Aesthetic influences ==
Chiho Aoshima's Mujina, 2002–03

Aoshima's work can be thought to come from somewhere in between innocent reality and a twisted dream world. Aoshima states that, "My work feels like strands of my thoughts that have flown around the universe before coming back to materialise."

=== Ukiyo-e ===
Chiho has said that ukiyo-e painter and printmaker Hokusai has had a great deal of influence in how she approaches her artistic renderings. Much like the traditional ukiyo-e compositions, her subjects are drawn with a well defined flat line and are placed in a single plane of depth. The ukiyo-e principals also play a heavy influence on her overarching style principal known as superflat.

=== Yokai and the Supernatural ===
Aoshima has admitted to being inspired by Hokusai's Yokai (or yōkai) art work being part of her inspirations. Yokai such as the rokurokubi (the long neck woman) has appeared in her piece Strawberry fields. Additionally kemonomimi appear throughout Aoshima's works and while not directly yokai are believed to have been derived from yokai like the bakeneko (supernatural cat) or the nekomata (cat ghost).

Cemeteries and graveyards also inspire Aoshima's work as she herself has admitted. Being born in a concrete jungle like Tokyo it is difficult to find nature but cemeteries host various insects, animals, trees, and bushes in the midst of the tall buildings and blinding lights of the city.

=== Superflat ===
Aoshima's works are considered superflat, the postmodern art movement which was founded by Takashi Murakami. Using digital drawing tools Aoshima creates unique scenes featuring nymphettes cavorting with animals, cheerleaders gone awry, and blood-stained sashimi slicers, all depicted with soft, cool colors, little modeling, and a dreamy, teen point of view.

For Superflat, a 2001 exhibition at the Museum of Contemporary Art in Los Angeles, Aoshima scaled up The red-eyed tribe, a highly detailed landscape filled with stylish young women, originally made for an Issey Miyake advertisement, to a massive fifteen by fifty-two feet. Because of the nature of the medium, there was no loss of clarity in the production of the giant digital prints, and the transference of the intimate, hand-held scale of mango to billboard bombast illuminates the possibilities of the simplified manga look for environmental applications.

=== Shōjo ===
Aoshima's feminine figures usually have big eyes, small facial features and thin bodies.

Aoshima combines childlike atmospheres and grotesque scenes. “Because of the places where I’m presenting my work, I sometimes feel I have to make lighter, happier image. But I really enjoy drawing the dark, disturbing worlds. Of course, in the end, even those should be cute,” she said.

Artists who use shōjo techniques are often critiqued for perpetuating cultural norms through their use of gender defining roles for their female characters. Oftentimes shōjo is seen as a feminist movement, however Chiho denies any such political affiliation.

== Galleries ==
- Galerie Perrotin, Paris, France
- Kaikai Kiki Collective, Long Island, NY

== Permanent collections ==
- Ackland Art Museum, Chapel Hill, NC
- Museum of Contemporary Art, Chicago, IL
- Carnegie Museum of Art, Pittsburgh, PA
- Seattle Art Museum, Seattle, WA

== Associated people ==
- Takashi Murakami
- Issey Miyake
