= Superstroke =

Contemporary art movement

Superstroke is a term used for a contemporary art movement with its origins in South Africa. Superstroke is one of the influential art movements regarding African modernism and abstraction. The word "Superstroke" implies the super expressive brush stroke. The Superstroke art movement was initially founded as a reaction to the impact that the Superflat art movement, founded by Takashi Murakami had on modern contemporary art.

== Manifesto ==
The manifesto for the Superstroke art movement was written in 2008 by the South African artist Conrad Bo and deals with various forms of how paintings in the movement should be executed. This includes the statement that paintings should be created by using very expressive brush strokes.

The manifesto also deals with photography and states that expressionism is more important than photo-realism. Then the manifesto states that abstract and figurative art is allowed in Superstroke. It goes further and states that certain subject matters are encouraged, and also makes mention of an African theme. Finally the manifesto states that the concept of "art for the sake of art" does not apply, and that members of the movement must produce paintings with texture, and excessive brush or pencil strokes.

== Influences ==
Although the concept of Superstroke was a reaction to Superflat, the paintings in the Superstroke art movement are heavily influenced by Alberto Giacometti, Pablo Picasso and Vincent van Gogh.

== Artwork ==
Art in Superstroke, varies from realism to abstract, monochrome and full color. Different media such as collage, charcoal and plaster of paris are used. Paintings in Superstroke are also identifiable by the frequent use of mathematical signs such as plus, minus, and equal signs.

== Contributors ==
Artists whose artworks are regarded as Superstroke are, Greg Simmonds, Diiezel, Mr. Sputnik, Menno Baars, John Zaverdino, May Wentworth, Conrad Bo, Jaco Erwee, Laetitia Lups.

== See also ==
- Superflat
- Abstract Expressionism
