= Machino, Klyapovskoye Rural Settlement =

Machino Мачино
- Village
- Location within Perm Krai Location within Russia
- Coordinates: 57°41′N 57°39′E
- Country: Russia
- Region: Perm Krai
- District: Beryozovsky District
- Time zone: UTC+5:00

Machino (Russian: Мачино) is a rural locality (a village) in Klyapovskoye Rural Settlement, Beryozovsky District, Perm Krai, Russia. The population was 104 as of 2010.

== Geography ==
It is located on the Barda River.
