= Henmaru Machino =

Japanese artist

Henmaru Machino (町野 変丸 Machino Henmaru, sometimes given as 'Hanmaru', born 1969, Aomori Prefecture) is a Japanese artist, described as the Magritte of the eromanga world, whose works prominently feature themes of bestiality, dysmorphia, hermaphrodism, and body transformation, as well as dozens of other sexual paraphilia. Most of his work has emerged within a paradigm of hentai manga and images, but some has appeared in galleries; several of his pieces were part of Takashi Murakami's traveling Superflat exhibition.

Machino started his career through submitting illustration work to the hentai magazine Manga Hot Milk.

While Machino's work defies any easy categorization, it could be said to fall within the Japanese EroGuro (Erotic Grotesque) school, still somewhat loosely defined, which dates back to Dada-influenced, Showa-era Decadence. Some assert that it is pornography of the most extreme variety, and nothing more. While porn-or-art debates have been occurring around a wide variety of works for centuries across the globe, the debates surrounding Machino are unique in that his subject matter is at the far fringes of human sexual experience, and even beyond it, in that much of what he draws could never occur in the real world. While many EroGuro artists create works that could have real-world analogues (S&M, mutilation, etc.), Machino's images of, for example, girls with dozens of phalli sprouting from each of the dozens of breasts that cover their body, are not something any viewer of his work could ever see in life, and thus the issue of "what is pornography?" strongly preempts the issue of "art or pornography?" in some of his work.

== Partial list of works ==
- Shōjo Chaos (少女カオス) - Mediax/MD Comics, 1994.
- SM Chokyoshi Hitomi - Unlicensed game for Super Famicom.
- Inu Ningyō (犬人形, Dog Doll) - Issui Sha/Izumi Comics, 1994.
- Maru Maru Henmaru Show (まるまる変丸ショウ) - East Press, 1996.
- Hōtō ni Atta Eroi Hanashi - Sanwa Shuppan, 1996.
- Super Yumiko-chan Z Turbo (スーパーゆみこちゃんＺターボ) - Ohta Shuppan/Ohta Comics, 1996.
- Ō-ana (大穴, Big Hole) - Issui Sha/Izumi Comics, 1997
- Man O Michi (まん○道) - Issui Sha/Izumi Comics, 1998.
- Seventeen (17) - Ohta Shuppan/Ohta Comics, 1998.
- Tokimeki Yumiko-chan Memorial (ト・キ・メ・キゆみこちゃんメモリアル) - Kubo Shoten/World Comics, 1998.
- UFO (UFO) - Sanwa Shuppan, 1998.
- Nuruemon - Issui Sha/Izumi Comics, 1998.
- Kenzen Hentai Shōjo - Kubo Shoten/World Comics Special, 2002.
- Yumiko Jigoku (ゆみこ地獄, Yumiko Hell) - Sanwa Shuppan, 1997
- Dokidoki Henmaru Show (ドキドキ変丸ショウ) - East Press, 1999
- The Best of Yumiko-chan (ザ・ベスト・オブゆみこちゃん) - Issui Sha/Izumi Comics, 199?
