= Machino, Beryozovsky District =

Machino Мачино
- Village
- Location within Perm Krai Location within Russia
- Coordinates: 57°36′N 57°22′E
- Country: Russia
- Region: Perm Krai
- District: Beryozovsky District
- Time zone: UTC+5:00

Machino (Russian: Мачино) is a rural locality (a village) in Beryozovskoye Rural Settlement, Beryozovsky District, Perm Krai, Russia. The population was 88 as of 2010. There are 3 streets.

== Geography ==
It is located 2.5 km east from Beryozovka.
