= Saku Machino =

Japanese scholar (1943–2026)

- 町野 朔
- Born: September 17, 1943; Tokyo, Japan
- Died: July 25, 2026 (aged 82)

Academic background
- Education: University of Tokyo (1966)

Academic work
- Discipline: Criminal law, bioethics, medical law
- Notable works: Kanja no Jiko Ketteiken to Hō; Keihō Sōron

Saku Machino (Japanese: 町野 朔; September 17, 1943 – July 25, 2026) was a Japanese criminal law scholar who was a Professor at Sophia University. He was best known for his work at the intersection of law, bioethics, and medical law.

== Early life and career ==
Saku Machino was born in Tokyo on September 17, 1943. He attended Tokyo Metropolitan Igusa High School, after graduating, he pursued at the University of Tokyo. He then enrolled in the College of Arts and Sciences before completing his undergraduate studies at the Faculty of Law. During his longer education, he studied criminal law with a famous scholar Ryuichi Hirano. Machino passed the national bar examination in 1966 and served as a research assistant at the University of Tokyo Faculty of Law until 1969.

Machino started his career at Sophia University in 1969 as a lecturer in the Faculty of Law. He was promoted to associate professor in 1970 and served as a special research assistant at Notre Dame Law School in Indiana, United States from 1971 to 1973. In 1980, he was appointed full Professor of Law at Sophia University. He held many roles throughout his career in Sophia University, including Chair of the Department of Law from 1990 to 1994, Dean of the Faculty of Law from 1997 to 1998, Director of the Institute for Social Justice from 2004 to 2005, and Dean of the Graduate School of Law from 2005 to 2007. Following the establishment of Japanese law schools, he served as Professor at the Sophia University Law School from 2003 to 2011. In 2011, he joined Sophia University's Institute of Bioethics as a professor. He retired from being a professor and was named Professor Emeritus. Machino was also a member of the Science Council of Japan from 2000 to 2011.

== Death ==
Machino died on July 25, 2026, at the age of 82.
