= Yusuke Nakamura (artist) =

Japanese artist

Nakamura Yusuke
- 中村 佑介
- Pronunciation: Nakamura Yusuke
- Born: January 26, 1978 (age 48); Takarazuka, Hyogo, Japan
- Education: Osaka University of Arts
- Occupations: illustrator, manga artist, and musician
- Notable work: the CD jacket design of ASIAN KUNG-FU GENERATION The Tatami Galaxy(character designer) Fruit Juice Gummies(character designer)
- Website: www.yusukenakamura.net

Yusuke Nakamura (Japanese:中村 佑介, Hepburn: Nakamura Yusuke, born 26 January 1978) is a Japanese illustrator, manga artist, and musician. Born in Takarazuka, Hyogo, he now lives in Osaka. He graduated from the design major of Osaka University of Arts.

== Biography ==
Yusuke Nakamura was born in Takarazuka City, Hyogo Prefecture, Japan. His father is an architect, and his mother is Machiko Yamashita (a professor and doctor at Otemae University). He has been drawing since he was a child. He loves video games. When he was at Osaka University of Arts, he aimed to get a job at a game company, and studied computer and design in a CG course. Also, since he originally liked records and CD jackets, he also drew jackets of fictional artists as a hobby. After graduating from university in 2000, he served as an assistant in his original major. Since 2002, he has been actively working on illustrations. At first, he drew and stored his illustrations without showing them to anyone, but when he was invited to a solo exhibition, he made them public for the first time, and the number of illustrations surprised those people around him.

In 2005, at the age of 28, he started his music career as a guitarist and vocalist in the band "S▲ILS (Sails)". On June 28, 2011, he announced his marriage with S▲ILS member Azusa Hasegawa in his blog.

== Person ==
- Manga artist Masakazu Ishiguro was his university classmate. They have influenced each other's work and remain close friends.
- His hobbies include manga, video games, collecting Transformers figures, and watching adult films.
- He is a fan of Kaoru Hirata and has drawn cover illustrations for her blog.
- He actively participates in lectures and talk shows. During exhibitions, he holds autograph sessions, carefully inscribing illustrations alongside his signature.
- People Influenced by him include Takahiro Matsumoto, Kenji Ozawa, Fujiko F. Fujio, Mitsuru Adachi, Yoko Kondo, Momoko Sakura, and Woody Allen.
- His favorite illustrators are Seiichi Hayashi, Seizo Watase, Minoru Yonezawa, Satoshi Hyodo, and Norman Rockwell.
- His drawing procedure is a rough sketch with a pencil, a draft→ inking (Copic Multiliner), → scanning the sketch to a computer → coloring it with Photoshop. Therefore, most of the original drawings are only line drawings. The reason why there are many profiles in the figures is because "I want to draw them with curves". Because side views allow for more graceful lines than front-facing poses.
- Masafumi Goto of the rock band ASIAN KUNG-FU GENERATION commissioned him to design album covers starting with their debut, Hōkai Amplifier.
- He also manages and produces the internet radio show Yonashi Hosshitsu (Pear Broadcasting Room).

== List of major works ==
=== CD jacket ===
- ASIAN KUNG-FU GENERATION
  - All works (except The Recording at NHK CR-509 Studio, Easter, Wonder Future, Right Now and AKG TRIBUTE)
- Spitz
  - Mikazuki Rock (2003) (Analog Lyric Card)
- GENTOUKI
  - Dull Season (2003)
  - Lovely, that guy. (2003)
  - A Filled Heart (2004)
  - As Always (2003)
  - Gento Masterpiece Theater (2007)
  - Birthday (2016)
- MOWMOW LULU GYABAN
  - Noguchi, Kutsukawa De Bakushi (2009)
  - Kuro Nara Kekko Desu (2010)
- Sails(A pop band formed by Yusuke Nakamura on July 1, 2005. The original formation was a trio consisting of Yusuke Nakamura (Vo, Guitar), Azusa Hasegawa (Vo, Acordion), and Masayuki Kaihara (Bass, Cho). Changed the notation to make it easier to search from "S▲ILS")
  - Pink (2011,Waikiki Records)
  - Kaoru (2013)
  - YOU (2014,Waikiki Records)
- Comics
  - Tele Nichi (2003,Starz Publishing)
  - Always (2006 - 2007,Osaka University of Arts)
  - And Yet the Town Moves Official doujinshi ~ Marukocho Shopping Street 2010 Summer Festival Special Issue ~ (2010,Shonen Gahosha,by Masakazu Ishiguro)-back cover illustration
  - Thursday no Frutto (2011, Akita Shoten)-Title and illustration
  - Cover of ADVENTURE TIME: Marceline & The Scream Queens (2017,Nebulasha)
  - Gal Doctor Ayape Vol. 2 (2019)-Illustration
  - Kamonogatari 8 Special Edition (2020,Kodansha)-Illustration Card
- Anime TV series
  - The Tatami Galaxy (2010)
  - And Yet the Town Moves E11-Courtesy of Background Illustration
  - Love and Lies (July 2017) Ep11-End Card
