= Bome (sculptor) =

Japanese sculptor

Bome (ボーメ, Bōme) is the pseudonym of a Japanese sculptor, primarily sculpting anime-styled women for mass commercial release. The name is a contraction of Baseball Cap (野球帽, Yakyū bō) and Eyeglasses (めがね, Megane), both of which he wears regularly. He started making garage kits and now works for Kaiyodo, a Japanese company that specialises in anime-related figurines. Bome's work has proved sufficiently popular and successful for Kaiyodo to release a Monsieur Bome Collection, including figures from such popular anime and video games as GunBuster, Full Metal Panic!, Dead or Alive, Kiddy Grade, Xenosaga and Jingai Makyō. Bome has, amongst others, also sculpted characters from Neon Genesis Evangelion and Sailor Moon.

Bome's work, like some of the anime on which it is based, often combines cute facial features with exaggerated sexual attributes such as large, gravity-defying breasts. Many figures are scantily clad or posed so that undergarments are visible. Occasionally, they may possess removable clothing which will expose knickers or bras. At least one figurine (Jungle Emi) was allegedly bare-breasted in its Japanese release; it was supposed to include a removable halter top bra in its worldwide release, however many disappointed fans found that the halter top is actually not removable. His latest (and possibly final) model in the Mon-Soeur Bome series, Akira from Sukapon-Do, is a rework of a model he previously did - with her breasts covered back up. See the "Erotica" section of the website listed in this page's References for the original model.

Collectors and toy-buyers regard Bome's work as being of good quality due to its accurate paintwork, fine detail, accurate representation of the character, naturalistic poses and high manufacturing standards. This opinion is reflected by the 1998 exhibition of Bome's work as part of Ero Pop Tokyo, an event, organised by Japanese artist Takashi Murakami, held in Los Angeles during May to June.

== Works in Order ==
=== Mon-sieur Bome series ===
- Vol.01: Oni-Musume (She-Devil) (& Blue Repaint Version)
- Vol.02: Tora-Musume (She-Tiger) (& White Repaint Version)
- Vol.03: Oni-Musume 2 (& White Repaint Version)
- Vol.04: Halloween-chan
- Vol.05: Kirasaki Mai (Red) (orange mail order edition only 1000 produced)
- Vol.06: Kirasaki Sai (Green) & Kirasaki Sui (Blue version, special released on US anime convention)
- Vol.07: Bunny Girl (& Black Repaint Version) & White version (US anime con version)
- Vol.08: Xenosaga KOS-MOS
- Vol.09: Kiddy Grade - Eclair & Lumiere
- Vol.10: Magical Canan - Carmine (2006)
- Vol.11: Jungle Emmy (& Combat Version) & Cow Pattern (US anime con version)
- Vol.12: Full Metal Panic! - Chidori Kaname & Teletha Testarossa
- Vol.13: Jingai Makyou - Ignis
- Vol.14: Dead or alive - Kasumi White dress (2006) & Black repaint version
- Vol.15: Dead or alive - Kasumi Blue dress (Black version Tecmo’s Online Shop Exclusive Version)
- Vol.16: Oni-Musume 3 (& White Repaint Version)
- Vol.17: Oni-Musume 4
- Vol.18: Gunbuster - Noriko Takaya (2006)
- Vol.19: Kichikuou Rance - Yamamoto Isoroku
- Vol.20: Otaku no Video - Misty May (2007)
- Vol.21: Honey Bunny Rio & Karen
- Vol.22: Fate/Stay Night - Tousaka Rin
- Vol.23: Fate/Stay Night - Saber
- Vol.24: DieBuster - Buster-Machine No.07 Nono (2007)
- Vol.25: Mitsumi Misato Lucia from 'Positive Penguin Life'
- Vol.26: Akira from 'Sukapon-Do' by Yano Takumi (according to a label on the blister pack, this may be the last in the series)

=== Other works ===
Tenjou Tenge

- Aya Natsume (& Tokubetsu Variant)
- Maya Natsume (& Tokubetsu Variant)

Kiddy Grade

- Eclair & Lumiere Alternative version

Other Kaiyodo Figures

- Himekuri
- Ryoko Mitsurugi (Samurai Girl)
- Asuka Sugo 1 & 2 (Cyber Formula)
- Super Sailor Moon & Various Sailor Moon Characters
- Elfarcia
- Asuka Souryou Langley (Neon Genesis Evangelion)
- Ruri Hoshino (Nadesico)
- Pricia (Virtual Call 3)
- Multi & Akari (To Heart)
- Yuko Asahina (Tokimeki Memorial)
- 1/5 Minky Momo (1992, Kaiyodo)
- Usagi 1-gō (1993, Kaiyodo)

Other Figures

- -Narusegawa Naru

== Exhibitions and events ==
=== Solo exhibitions ===
- "Bome" – January 1998, Feature Inc., New York
- "Monsieur Bome" – February 2002, Wonder Festival 2002 [Winter], Tokyo Bigcite
- "Bome : The 10th Anniversary Exhibition" Parco Factory – October 2007, Parco Factory, Tokyo
- "Psyche" – December 2009, Kaikai Kiki Gallery, Tokyo
- "Psyche" – December 2010, Kaikai Kiki Gallery, Taipei

=== Featured exhibitions ===
- "Wonder Festival" – 1993 (the first time to show Bome schale 50 centimeters tall bishojo figure)
- "Elopop Tokyo" – May 1998, George's XLarge, Los Angeles
- "Super Flat" – April 2000, Parco Gallery, Tokyo
- "Super Flat" – January 2001, Museum of Contemporary Art, Los Angeles, Los Angeles
- "un art populaire" – June 2001, Fondation Cartier pour l'art contemporain, Paris
- "Genealogy of the Figurine: from Dogu to Kaiyodo", Summer special exhibition – July–September, 2010, Kyoto International Manga Museum, Kyoto
- "SCOPE Basel 2012" – June 2012, Basel
- "Bishōjo no bijutsu-shi" – July to September 2014, Aomori Museum of Art, Aomori.
  - – September to November 2014, Shizuoka Prefectural Museum of Art, Shizuoka.
  - – December 2014 to February 2015, Iwami Art Museum, Masuda.

== Bibliography ==
- Bome Works - Figurine Super Collection. blitz mook (in Japanese). Kadokawa. 1999. ISBN 978-4073111023.
- Bome Works from 1983 to 2008 (in Japanese). Softbank Creative. 28 March 2009. ISBN 978-4797352986. OCLC 676403388. - 10th anniversary since debut as an independent artist with 100 works.
- Bome; Murakami, Takashi (28 July 2010). Bome – Selected Works 1983-2009 (in Japanese). Kaikai Kiki Co., Ltd. ISBN 978-4939148392. OCLC 969450508. - exhibition catalog, "Psyche" 2009.
