= 71st NHK Kōhaku Uta Gassen =

- Also known as: 71st NHK Red & White Year-End Song Festival
- 第71回NHK紅白歌合戦: 今こそ歌おう みんなでエール
- Genre: Music, Variety, Special
- Created by: Tsumoru Kondo
- Directed by: Yukinori Kida
- Presented by: Teruyoshi Uchimura; Maho Kuwako
- Starring: Fumi Nikaido; Yo Oizumi
- Judges: Tetsuko Kuroyanagi; Sandwichman; Hana Sugisaki; Shota Sometani; Daiya Seto; Yoshiko Miyazaki; Amon Miyamoto; Koji Murofushi; Ryo Yoshizawa
- Theme music composer: John Turner, Geoffrey Parsons
- Opening theme: "Smile"
- Ending theme: "Hotaru no Hikari"
- Composers: Takahiro Kaneko; Tsunaki Mihara
- Country of origin: Japan
- Original language: Japanese

Production
- Production location: NHK Hall
- Running time: 265 minutes
- Production company: NHK Enterprise Inc.

Original release
- Network: NHK-G; NHK World Premium; TV Japan
- Release: December 31, 2020

The 71st NHK Kōhaku Uta Gassen (第71回NHK紅白歌合戦; The 71st NHK Red & White Song Battle) was the 2020 (Reiwa 2) edition of NHK's television special Kōhaku Uta Gassen, held on December 31, 2020, live from NHK Hall (Tokyo, Japan), and broadcast in Japan through NHK General Television and NHK Radio 1, and worldwide through TV Japan (US only) and NHK World Premium.

This was the first edition in history in which the special was broadcast without a studio audience due to the ongoing COVID-19 pandemic. The audience was replaced with off-venue voting, in which votes determined the winning team for this event. This was the last edition until 2022 to be held in the NHK Hall as the venue will close for renovations and earthquake-proofing, which is scheduled to end some time in June 2022; the next edition will take place at the Tokyo International Forum.

The Red Team won the edition for the first time since 2016, four years prior.

== Events leading up to broadcast ==
Unless otherwise stated, all events in the article reflects the current year of 2020.

- On September 10, NHK chairman Terunobu Maeda announced that the edition will be closed-door due to the COVID-19 pandemic, a first in history for the Kōhaku Uta Gassen. The special was also delayed by 15 minutes till 7.45pm.
- On November 2, NHK announced Teruyoshi Uchimura and Maho Kuwako as the show's moderators, the latter returning after a year's absence and replacing Mayuko Wakuda on her behalf; Fumi Nikaido and Yo Oizumi were the team leaders for the Red and White teams, respectively. The theme for that season is "今こそ歌おう みんなでエール" (lit. "Everyone Let's Sing and Yell Together"; Ima koso utaou min'na de ēru)
- On November 16, NHK announced the performers; nine performers making their debut this season including Sakurazaka46, (Note: If appearances under their former name Keyakizaka46 were counted, this would have been their fifth appearance.) Juju, Tokyo Jihen, NiziU, BABYMETAL, Milet, SixTones and Snow Man. Music group Greeeen also performed in the opening.
- On December 12, Yumi Matsutoya announced she would step down from the Red team and be performing a special song, "Mamotte Agetai".
- On December 13, Ryota Yamasato and Naomi Watanabe were revealed as hosts for the special.
- On December 14, Masashi Sada was announced to appear in one of the Specials; this is Sada's first appearance after a 13-year hiatus since 2007, and the 22nd artist to have surpass 20 Kōhaku Uta Gassen appearances.
- On December 21, the song lists for the performers were unveiled.
- On December 23, Yoasobi also announced their debut with the new song "Yoru ni Kakeru", marking the first instance the performer making their debut was not involved physically.
- On December 24, Snow Man announces their withdrawal from the show after one of the members for the band, Ryota Miyadate, was tested positive for COVID-19. This is the first time since the 22nd edition, 49 years prior, where a withdrawal of performances occurred, also for health reasons (Hiroshi Uchiyamada and Cool Five's singer Kiyoshi Maekawa was ill and was replaced by Keiko Fuji on one of the performances). Snow Man could have performed "D.D." alongside SixTones on the first half.
- On December 28, the order of performances was unveiled.
- On December 30, rehearsals were underway. One singer, Kōji Tamaki, revealed his song lineup "Den-en" to be performed as a special on the second half of the show; this is Tamaki's first Special performance since the 47th event in 1996, 24 years prior.

=== Show highlights and other statistics ===
- Hiroshi Miyama set a world record for the most players involved in a Kendama playing, with 125 (including host Oizumi), surpassing the previous record of 124 in the 2018 event two years ago. This was the fourth consecutive year Miyama had attempted to achieve a world record, hence the subtitle "Round 4", and the second consecutive year with 125 performers after the failure on last year.
- This is Arashi's final involvement in Kōhaku Uta Gassen after 12 consecutive years of appearance due to the band taking a hiatus announced on January 27, 2019.
- NiziU became the fastest artist/group to have appeared in a Kōhaku Uta Gassen since their debut on December 2, 29 days ago (the previous holder was WaT in the 2002's edition, appearing in just 1 month and 29 days after their debut).
- Veteran singer Hiroshi Itsuki became the second performer to have made more than 50 appearances in Kōhaku Uta Gassen (the first being Saburō Kitajima who achieved this distinction in 2013) and the first performer to appear 50 times consecutively.
- This event marked the first time AKB48 or even one of the AKB48 Group groups didn't appear on Kōhaku Uta Gassen, breaking their 10-year streak of 12 appearances, although they didn't appear on the 2008 edition. Only Sakamichi Series groups were there present for this edition.
- This edition marked BABYMETAL's first, and so far only, appearance to date at the event.
- This is also the first time that both of Amuse's biggest properties (Perfume and BABYMETAL) performed together at the event, in back to back performances (Perfume at 21, BABYMETAL at 22).

== Personnel ==
=== Presenters ===
- Red Team: Fumi Nikaido
- White Team: Yo Oizumi
- Moderators: Teruyoshi Uchimura & Maho Kuwako
- Narrators: Naoyuki Tamura & Nonoka Akaki

=== Judges ===
- Tetsuko Kuroyanagi- current judge for NHK Kōhaku Uta Gassen
- Sandwichman (Mikio Date and Takeshi Tomizawa)- Comedian duo
- Hana Sugisaki- "Ochoyan" lead actress
- Shōta Sometani- "Kirin ga Kuru" second lead actor
- Chicko- Chico Will Scold You! main voice actor
- Yoshiko Miyazaki- actress
- Amon Miyamoto- musical director
- Koji Murofushi- sports athlete
- Ryo Yoshizawa- "Seiten wo Tsuke" lead actor

=== Guests ===
Additional crew

== Artist lineup ==
Performers

Debuting artists Returning artists Special performances

Red Team				White Team			
Order	Artist	Appearance	Song	Order	Artist	Appearance	Song
Front half
2	Foorin	2	"Paprika" (パプリカ)	1	King & Prince	3	"I Promise"
4	Milet	1	"Inside You"	3	Keisuke Yamauchi	6	"Koisuru Machikado" (恋する街角)
5	Hinatazaka46	2	"Azato Kawaii" (アザトカワイイ)	7	Hey! Say! JUMP	4	"Kōhaku Special ~Min'na de ēru 2020~" (Note: Sang "Ultra Music Power" and "Asu e no Yell" in order.) (紅白SPメドレー ～みんなでエール2020～)
6	Sakurazaka46	1	Nobody's Fault	7	Hey! Say! JUMP	4	"Kōhaku Special ~Min'na de ēru 2020~" (紅白SPメドレー ～みんなでエール2020～)
8	Little Glee Monster	4	"Ashiato" (足跡)	9	SixTones	1	Imitation Rain
10	Kaori Mizumori	18	"Seto Inland Shodoshima ～2020 Shine Special～" (瀬戸内 小豆島 ～2020映えSP～)	11	Generations	2	You & I
13	Fuyumi Sakamoto	32	"Buddha no yō ni Watashi wa Shinda" (ブッダのように私は死んだ)	12	Junretsu	3	"Ai o Kudasai 〜Don't you cry〜" (愛をください ～Don't you cry～)
15	Yoshimi Tendo	25	"Anta no Hanamichi ~Fukkin taiko midareuchi SP ~" (あんたの花道 ～腹筋太鼓乱れ打ちSP～)	14	Kis-My-Ft2	2	"We Never Give Up!"
Special performance / Masashi Sada "Kiseki 2021"
16	Nogizaka46	6	"Route 246"	17	Masayuki Suzuki	3	"Yume de Aetara" (夢で逢えたら)
"Ima koso utaou min'na de ēru" Special performance "Kohaku Disney Medley" King & Prince and Nogizaka46 / "When You Wish Upon a Star" (星に願いを); Fumi Nikaido and Kiyoshi Hikawa / "A Whole New World" (ホール・ニュー・ワールド); Naomi Watanabe, King & Prince and Nogizaka46 / "It's a Small World" (小さな世界)
				18	Hiroshi Itsuki	50	"Sanga" (山河)
Back half
19	NiziU	1	"Make You Happy"				
21	Perfume	13	"Perfume Medley 2020" (Note: Sang "Dream Fighter", "Baby Cruising Love" and "Time Warp" in order.)	20	Eito	1	"Kōsui" (香水)
22	Babymetal	1	"Ijime, Dame, Zettai" (イジメ、ダメ、ゼッタイ)	23	Hiromi Go	33	Kyohei Tsutsumi Tribute Medley (Note: Sang "Otoko no Ko Onna no Ko" and "Yoroshiku Aishū" in order.) (筒美京平 トリビュートメドレー)
24	Juju	1	"Yasashisa de Afureru yō ni" (やさしさで溢れるように)				
Web drama serial special Yell
Greeeen Starlit Kōhaku Special (Note: Sang "Hoshikage no Yell" and "Kiseki" in order.)
				25	Arashi	12	Arashi x Kōhaku 2020 Nonstop Medley (Note: Sang "Kite", "Kimi no Uta", and "Happiness" in order.) (嵐×紅白2020スペシャルメドレー)
26	LiSA	2	Demon Slayer: Kimetsu no Yaiba Kōhaku medley (Note: Sang "Gurenge" and "Homura" in order.) (アニメ「鬼滅の刃」紅白SPメドレー)	27	Official Hige Dandism	2	"I Love..."
29	Yoasobi	1	"Yoru ni Kakeru" (夜に駆ける)	28	Hiroshi Miyama	6	"Kita no On'na Machi～Round 4 Road to Kendama World Record～ (北のおんな町 ～第4回 けん玉世界記録への道～)
31	Tokyo Jihen	1 (Note: Lead singer Ringo Sheena's seventh appearance.)	"Leap & Peal Active End Mark" (うるうるうるう〜能動的閏〆篇〜)	30	Kanjani Eight	9	"Let's dance together! Positive scream!" (みんなで踊ろう！前向きスクリーム！)
33	Aimyon	2	"Naked Heart" (裸の心)	32	Yuzu	11	"After the Rain Reruya / I Qant to Protect ～Ode to Joy Kōhaku SP～" (雨のち晴レルヤ ～歓喜の歌 紅白SP～)
Yoshiki "Endless Rain" (Note: With Roger Taylor and Brian May of Queen, Sarah Brightman, Babymetal, SixTones, Lisa, and Milet.)
34	Superfly	5	"Ai o Komete Hanataba o" (愛をこめて花束を)	35	Mr. Children	2	"Documentary film"
36	Sayuri Ishikawa	43	Amagi-goe (天城越え)	37	Gen Hoshino	6	"Uchi de Odorō (ōmisoka)" (うちで踊ろう (大晦日))
39	Seiko Matsuda	24	"Ruriiro no Chikyū 2020" (瑠璃色の地球 2020)	38	Kiyoshi Hikawa	21	"Genkai Toppa × Survivor" (限界突破×サバイバー)
Yumi Matsutoya "Mamotte Agetai" (守ってあげたい)
Kōji Tamaki "Den'en"
41	Misia	5	"Ai no Katachi" (アイノカタチ)	40	Masaharu Fukuyama	13	"Kazoku ni Narō yo / Fighting Pose" (家族になろうよ)

== Voting system and results ==
Voting is conducted after all the performances, and unlike the past two editions, the winning team is determined by the votes cast, due to a change in the voting format as a result of the COVID-19 pandemic. The Red Team was announced the winner in a 2,635,200-1,383,180 vote.
