= 68th NHK Kōhaku Uta Gassen =

- Created by: Tsumoru Kondo
- Presented by: Teruyoshi Uchimura; Maho Kuwako
- Starring: Kasumi Arimura; Kazunari Ninomiya
- Judges: Hifumi Katō; Ryohei Suzuki; Issei Takahashi; Mariko Hayashi; Nobuko Miyamoto; Mai Murakami; Ryōta Murata; Riho Yoshioka
- Opening theme: "Grand Opening"
- Ending theme: "Hotaru no Hikari"; Conductor: Shunichi Tokura
- Composer: Takahiro Kaneko

Production
- Executive producer: Yukinori Kida
- Producers: Production Manager; Ryo Yajima from AKB48 SHOW; Director; Tomoko Matsuda; Producer; Masashi Nishi
- Production locations: NHK Hall, Tokyo, Japan
- Running time: 1st Half: 1h40min 2nd Half: 2h45min
- Production company: NHK

Original release
- Network: NHK-General; NHK World Premium (Worldwide); TV Japan (US)
- Release: December 31, 2017

The 68th NHK Kōhaku Uta Gassen (第68回NHK紅白歌合戦) was the 68th edition of annual NHK's Kōhaku Uta Gassen, held on December 31, 2017, live from NHK Hall (Tokyo, Japan). It was broadcast in Japan through NHK General Television (TV) and NHK Radio 1 (Radio), and worldwide through NHK World Premium and TV Japan (in US). This year, the conductor of the festival's closing theme "Hotaru no Hikari" will be replaced by Shunichi Tokura, due to the death of Masaaki Hirao on July 21, 2017.

Broadcast runs from 19:15 (JST) to 23:45 (JST), with a 5-minute break for the latest news. This is the 29th Heisei Era edition.

The White Team won this event with 2,237,644 votes, thus making the 37th overall victory from Shirogumi.

== Broadcast and possible final edition from Heisei ==
Broadcast time was announced on September 7. This year's theme, "Let's Sing a Dream" (夢を歌おう) remains unchanged until the 70th edition (2019), in support of the upcoming 2020 Summer Olympics and 2020 Summer Paralympics. The 68th Kouhaku airs on December 31 (Sunday), starting from 19:15 JST and ending at 23:45 JST, with a 5-minute break for the latest news. In Japan, the broadcast takes place through NHK-G and Radio 1, and worldwide by NHK World Premium and TV Japan. In the United States, the show is broadcast through TV Japan, starting around 15:10 (Eastern Time). Viewers outside Japan (except US) can watch Kouhaku on NHK World Premium, starting at 10:15 UTC, the same time as the NHK-G broadcast.

This is the 29th and penultimate edition of the program in the Heisei Period, because of the possible abdication of Emperor Akihito, already scheduled for March 31, 2019. The Kouhaku has already undergone a transition of periods. The 39th edition (last of the Showa Period) was held a week before Hirohito's death, and the 40th edition was the first ever in Heisei. The show will go through a new era transition in 2019, with the 70th edition being the first under a new Japanese imperial era.

On November 13, NHK announced their team leaders. Once again, Kasumi Arimura will be the captain from red team, while Kazunari Ninomiya from Arashi will serve as captain from white team for the 6th time (counted with other 5 times while Arashi served as captains). Japanese comedian Teruyoshi Uchimura will be the mediator, thus making the second edition in a row to not repeat mediator from previous edition.

On November 16, the list of program artists was revealed and a press conference announcing the participants took place. The second mediator NHK news anchor Maho Kuwako was also announced. Namie Amuro, who is set to retire September next year, was not confirmed to appear. NHK production manager Ryo Yajima made a statement saying that negotiations for her appearance are still ongoing. On December 19, Amuro was confirmed to appear on Kōhaku as a special guest.

On December 7, it was announced that Shunichi Tokura is the new conductor of the closing theme, "Hotaru no Hikari", replacing Masaaki Hirao, who died in July. The guest judges were revealed on December 20. On December 22, Keisuke Kuwata was announced to appear as a special guest. The song list was revealed on December 23.

On December 29, rehearsals from the main event has been started. Namie Amuro and Keisuke Kuwata (Special Acts) will perform before the final acts (Sayuri Ishikawa and Yuzu) prior the announcement of the winning team.

== Personnel ==
=== Main hosts and team leaders ===
Mediators

- Teruyoshi Uchimura
- Maho Kuwako

Team leaders

- AKAGUMI: Kasumi Arimura
- SHIROGUMI: Kazunari Ninomiya (Arashi)

=== Live comments ===
- Announcer NHK Radio 1: Tomoko Kogou, Naoki Ninomiya
- PR, Commentary ("Ura Talk Channel"): Bananaman, Ai Tsukahara
- Live Stream ("Back Stage Talk"): Naomi Watanabe

=== Judges ===
- Hifumi Katō (former shogi player)
- Ryohei Suzuki (actor), will star in Segodon
- Issei Takahashi (actor), played Ono Masatsugu in Naotora: The Lady Warlord
- Mariko Hayashi, the original author of Segodon
- Nobuko Miyamoto (actress), appeared in Hiyokko
- Mai Murakami (artistic gymnasts)
- Ryōta Murata (boxer)
- Riho Yoshioka (actress)

=== Live music performance ===
- Oomisoka Ongakutai 2017 (Conductor: Takahiro Kaneko)

=== Special guests ===
- Shunichi Tokura ("Hotaru no Hikari" conductor)
- Namie Amuro
- Keisuke Kuwata
- Tetsuko Kuroyanagi
- Yoshihide Kiryū

=== Other guests ===
- Toro-Salmon
- Kazuko Kurosawa
- Kumamon
- Wakana Aoi
- Sunshine Ikezaki
- Miyazon
- Austin Mahone

=== Contestants ===
Debuting or returning artists are in bold.

| Red Team | | White Team | |
| Singer/Group | Performance Time | Singer/Group | Performance Time |
|---|---|---|---|
| Ai | 3 | Arashi | 9 |
| E-girls | 5 | Hiroshi Itsuki | 47 |
| Sayuri Ishikawa | 40 | X Japan | 8 |
| Yukino Ichikawa | 2 | **Elephant Kashimashi** | Debut |
| AKB48 | 10 | Kanjani8 | 6 |
| **Midori Oka** | Debut | Hiromi Go | 30 |
| **Mai Kuraki** | 4 | Sandaime J Soul Brothers | 6 |
| Keyakizaka46 | 2 | Sekai no Owari | 4 |
| Fuyumi Sakamoto | 29 | Sexy Zone | 5 |
| Ringo Sheena | 5 | **Takehara Pistol** | Debut |
| **Shishamo** | Debut | **Tortoise Matsumoto** | Debut |
| Aya Shimazu | 4 | Tokio | 24 |
| **Superfly** | 2 | Kiyoshi Hikawa | 18 |
| Mariko Takahashi | 5 | **Ken Hirai** | 8 |
| Yoshimi Tendo | 22 | Kohei Fukuda | 4 |
| **Twice** | Debut | Masaharu Fukuyama | 10 |
| Kana Nishino | 8 | **Hey! Say! JUMP** | Debut |
| Nogizaka46 | 3 | Gen Hoshino | 3 |
| Perfume | 10 | **Daichi Miura** | Debut |
| **Takako Matsu** | 3 | Hiroshi Miyama | 3 |
| Seiko Matsuda | 21 | Keisuke Yamauchi | 3 |
| Kaori Mizumori | 15 | Yuzu | 8 |
| **Little Glee Monster** | Debut | **WANIMA** | Debut |

==== Artists not attending this year ====
Red Team
Ayaka, Ikimonogakari, Hikaru Utada, Shinobu Otake, Kaori Kozai, PUFFY, Miwa
White Team
Kenta Kiritani, Kinki Kids, The Yellow Monkey, AAA, V6, Radwimps, Radio Fish

==== Debuting artists ====
Ten artists are attending for the first time:

- Daichi Miura celebrated his 20th anniversary since debuting as a member of Folder in 1997. Since making his solo debut in 2005, he has become known for his powerful singing and outstanding dancing skills. His single, "Excite", placed number one on the Oricon weekly single chart.
- Hey! Say! JUMP celebrated their 10th anniversary. Members Yamada and Chinen have participated four times as NYC (60th–63rd).
- Elephant Kashimashi celebrated their 30th anniversary. They embarked on a forty-seven prefecture anniversary tour in April.
- Tortoise Matsumoto has appeared with his band Ulfuls two times (47th and 52nd). His duet song with Ringo Sheena, "The Main Street", was used as the CM song for the luxury shopping complex Ginza Six.
- SHISHAMO's song, "Ashita mo", was used as the theme song for a mobile phone commercial (NTT DoCoMo).
- Takehara Pistol's song, "Yo, Soko no Wakai no", was used as the theme song for a Sumitomo Life Insurance commercial. The song was a "long hit".
- Wanima's song, "Yattemiyo", was used as the theme song for a mobile phone commercial (au). The commercial and song became hot topics and the song was a hit.
- Little Glee Monster performed at the Nippon Budokan January this year. Tickets to their concert sold out in just one minute. The group, who are all in their teens, made their major label debut in 2014. They are popular among people of all ages and are known for their solid singing skills.
- Twice debuted in Japan this year. "TT pose", which is part of the choreography for TT, became a trend for young women in Japan. Their debut single, "One More Time", placed number one on the Oricon weekly single chart.
- Enka singer Midori Oka released her first album this year. She also performed her first solo concert.

==== Returning artists ====
Four artists are returning:

- Matsu Takako sang the theme song for NHK's 97th asadora, Warotenka. She has performed at Kohaku two times. Her last appearance was in 1999 for the 50th edition.
- Mai Kuraki sang the theme song for the film Detective Conan: Crimson Love Letter. Her song, "Togetsukyo (Kimi Omou)", charted for 31 weeks on the Oricon weekly single chart. It was later named "the best-selling physical single by female solo singer in 2017". Kuraki has sung twenty-one theme songs for the Detective Conan animation series. In July, she was awarded Guinness World Record for "most theme songs sung by the same artist for an animation series". Kuraki has performed at Kohaku three times. Her last appearance was in 2005 for the 56th edition.

== Performance order ==
| Red Team | | | | White Team | | | |
| Order | Singer/Group | Appearances | Song | Order | Singer/Group | Appearances | Song |
First Part
| 2 | Little Glee Monster | Debut | "Suki da" ~Yume o Utaō ver.~ | 1 | Hey! Say! JUMP | Debut | "Come On A My House" |
| 4 | E-girls | 5 | "Love ☆ Queen" | 3 | Keisuke Yamauchi | 3 | "Ai ga Shinjirarenainara" ~Seme Kimiko-tachi Budōkai" |
| 5 | Shishamo | Debut | "Ashita mo" ~Kōhaku 2017 ver.~ | 6 | Hiroshi Miyama | 3 | "Otoko no Ryūgi" ~Kendama Sekai Kiroku e no Michi~ |
| 7 | Ai x Naomi Watanabe | 3 | "Kira Kira" | 8 | Takehara Pistol | Debut | "Yō, Soko no Wakai no" |
| 9 | Midori Oka | Debut | "Sado no Yūbue" | 10 | Sexy Zone | 5 | "Gyutto" |
| 11 | Yukino Ichikawa | 2 | "Jinsei Ichiro" | 12 | Kohei Fukuda | 4 | "Ōshō" |
| 14 | Yoshimi Tendo | 22 | "Dōtonbori Ninjō" | 13 | Sandaime J Soul Brothers | 6 | "Happy" ~Kōhaku Special Version~ |
| 16 | Mai Kuraki | 4 | "Togetsukyo (Kimi Omou)" | 15 | Sekai no Owari | 4 | "Rain" |
| 17 | Twice | Debut | "TT (Japanese Ver.)" | 18 | Daichi Miura | Debut | Daichi Miura Kōhaku Special |
| 19 | Kaori Mizumori | 15 | "Hayatomo no Seto" | 20 | Wanima | Debut | "Tomoni" |
| 21 | Aya Shimazu | 4 | "The Rose" | 22 | Hiromi Go | 30 | "2-oku 4-sen-man no Hitomi" ~Go! Go! Bubble Remix~ |
Halftime Show (presented by Kazunari Ninomiya); Naomi Watanabe - "Poker Face", "Born This Way"; Chiemi Blouson - "with B"; Austin Mahone - "Dirty Work"
Second Part
| 23 | Keyakizaka46 | 2 | "Fukyōwaon" | 24 | Kanjani Eight | 6 | "Nagurigaki Beat" |
| 26 | Fuyumi Sakamoto | 29 | "Otoko no Hi Matsuri" | 25 | Masaharu Fukuyama | 10 | "Tomoe Gakuen" |
| 27 | Kana Nishino | 8 | "Pa!" | 28 | Tokio | 24 | "Ambitious Japan" |
| 30 | Nogizaka46 | 3 | "Influencer" | 29 | Hiroshi Itsuki | 47 | "Yozora" |
Special Project - "Itsudemo Yume wo"
Hiyokko Special (Part 1)
| 31 | Seiko Matsuda | 21 | "Atarashii Ashita" | 32 | Ken Hirai | 8 | "Non-Fiction" |
| 33 | Ringo Sheena (5) & Tortoise Matsumoto (Debut) "The Main Street" | | | | | | |
| 34 | Perfume | 10 | "Tokyo Girl" | 35 | X Japan | 8 | "Endless Rain 2017 Kōhaku Special" |
| 36 | AKB48 | 10 | Shichō-sha ga Eranda Yume no Kōhaku SP Medley | 37 | Elephant Kashimashi | Debut | "Koyoi no Tsuki no yō ni" |
| 38 | Takako Matsu | 3 | "Ashita wa Dokokara" | 39 | Gen Hoshino | 3 | "Family Song" |
| 40 | Superfly | 2 | "Ai o Komete Hanataba o" | —N/a | | | |
Hiyokko Special (Part 2)
| —N/a | | | | 41 | Arashi | 9 | Arashi x Kōhaku Special Medley |
| 42 | Mariko Takahashi | 5 | "For You..." | 43 | Kiyoshi Hikawa | 18 | "Kiyoshi no Zunodokobushi" |
Namie Amuro - "Hero"
Keisuke Kuwata - "Wakai Hiroba"
| 44 | Sayuri Ishikawa | 40 | "Tsugaru Kaikyō Fuyugeshiki" | 45 | Yuzu | 8 | "Eikō no Kakehashi" |
"Hotaru no Hikari" (Ending theme, conducted by Shunichi Tokura)

Songs performed on medleys

- Little Glee Monster: "Jupiter", "Suki da"
- Daichi Miura: "Cry & Fight", Excite
- AKB48: "Ōgoe Diamond", "365-nichi no Kamihikōki", "11gatsu no Anklet"
- X Japan: "Endless Rain", "Kurenai"
- Arashi: "Guts!", "Doors (Yūki no Kiseki)"

== Final results and ratings ==
Final Results
| Votes | Red team | White team |
|---|---|---|
| Partials | | |
| Overall | 1,432,371 | 2,237,644 |
Individual Results; NHK Hall
| DTV | 1,431,292 | 2,236,339 |
| NHK Hall | 1,079 | 1,305 |
Winning Team: White
Ratings; Kanto:35.8% (1st Part) & 39.4% (2nd Part); Kansai: (1st Part) & (2nd Part)

== Notes ==
- Daichi Miura and Arashi were the first artists confirmed for this edition. Miura's "Excite" was released in January and topped #1 in Oricon Weekly Single Charts, and also contributed for "Mecha-Mecha Ikteru". Arashi was also confirmed for the conformation of Kazunari Ninomiya as white team's leader for the 6th time. Other Johnny's group confirmed to debut is Hey! Say! JUMP.
- AKB48, Keyakizaka46 & Nogizaka46 were confirmed for this Kouhaku. AKB48 currently is the best selling female artist after surpass Ayumi Hamasaki. Nogizaka46 has sold 2 million with "Influencer" and "Nigemizu". This will be the last time AKB48 member Mayu Watanabe will perform with the group, as well as Rie Kitahara. After rumours denied, Keyakizaka46 is confirmed. Once again, the two groups of the Sakamichi Series will perform the same night.
- The first confirmed embezzlements for this Kouhaku are: Ikimonogakari and Masaaki Hirao. The first (performed 9 times overall) announced finished hiatus in early January. The second, who participated four times overall in the program and was also the conductor of the closing theme "Hotaru no Hikari" (between 2006 and 2016), died on July 21, 2017, due to pneumonia.
- This is the first edition to be held on Sunday since 2006 (57th).
- Masaharu Fukuyama's performance on Kouhaku was held from a remote location, due to his "New Year's Eve Countdown Concert", on Pacifico Plaza.
- E-girls will have their first appearance on Kouhaku after the lineup changes from E★G Family.
- Five artists performed their Medleys: AKB48, Arashi, Daichi Miura, Little Glee Monster and X Japan.
- Hiroshi Itsuki's performance from "Yozora" is dedicated in memory of Masaaki Hirao.
- Debuting artists Hey! Say! JUMP and Little Glee Monster will be the first to perform on this Kouhaku. Sayuri Ishikawa and Yuzu will serve as this year's "Ootori".
- "Grand Opening" sequence was inspired on western musicals, such as La La Land.
- During X Japan's performance, Yoshiki played drums for the first time since his neck surgery.
- "Hotaru no Hikari" arrangement for the 68th edition is very different from the other years, with an E♭ key.
