= Sayuri Hori =

Japanese journalist (born 1990)

- 保里 小百合
- Born: May 25, 1990 (age 35); New York, United States
- Education: Keio University (Bachelor of Law)
- Occupations: television host; television presenter; announcer; journalist
- Years active: 2013–present
- Employer: NHK
- Television: Iba 6 announcer (2022-2024); Close-up Gendai Plus host (2021-2022); Asaichi correspondent (2020-2024); NHK Newsline anchor (since 2024)
- Title: NHK Announcer
- Term: 2013–present
- Spouse: Unknown (m. 2018)

Sayuri Hori (保里 小百合, Hori Sayuri; born May 25, 1990) is a Japanese announcer, television reporter, television personality, and news anchor for NHK. She is a former correspondent for NHK's morning infotainment program Asaichi, as well as a former newsreader for morning news show NHK News Ohayō Nippon.

== Early life and education ==
Hori was born in New York, United States. She moved with her family to Tokyo, Japan, where she was raised. In her childhood, she starred several dramas as a child actress.

She received the bachelor's degree in politics from the Faculty of Law of Keio University. During college, she was anchor for BS Fuji's news program BS Fuji News.

== Career ==
Hori was hired by NHK as an announcer in 2013, with Nonoka Akaki. She began her announcement career at NHK's Takamatsu Branch at Takamatsu, Kagawa Prefecture. In March 2016, she was relocated to the NHK Fukuoka Branch in Fukuoka Prefecture.

In April 2017, she was moved to NHK's Tokyo Announcement Room. She was a correspondent for News Watch 9 hosted by Maho Kuwako. From April 2018 to March 2020, she was a biweekly anchor with Risa Hayashida for the first two-hour segment of the morning news show NHK News Ohayō Nippon, which aired from 5am to 7am. In April 2020, she was a correspondent for the morning infotainment show Asaichi. In April 2021, she became one of the hosts for the documentary program Close-up Gendai Plus, succeeding the former host Shinichi Taketa.

In April 2022, she was moved to the NHK Mito Branch in Ibaraki Prefecture.

In March 2024, she was moved back to NHK's Tokyo Announcement Room.

In August 2024, She joined the NHK World team where she now presents on their flagship hourly news show - NHK Newsline.

Media offices
Preceded by Shinichi Taketa	Close-up Gendai Plus Host; 2021–2022	Succeeded by Maho Kuwako
