= Risa Hayashida =

Japanese journalist

- 林田 理沙
- Born: December 19, 1989 (age 36); Nagasaki Prefecture, Japan
- Other name: Linda
- Education: M.Mus., Graduate School of Tokyo University of the Arts
- Occupations: announcer; news presenter; reporter; television personality
- Years active: 2014–present
- Employer: NHK (2014–present)
- Television: Saturday Watch 9 anchor (2024–present); News Watch 9 anchor (2023–2024, 2026–present); NHK News 7 anchor (2022–2023); Shutoken Network anchor (2020–2022); Bura Tamori co-host (2018–2020); NHK News Ohayō Nippon newsreader (2018–2020)
- Title: NHK Announcer
- Term: 2014–present
- Spouse(s): Undisclosed (m. 2022; div. 2024) Kōhei Ueno (m. 2025)

Risa Hayashida (林田 理沙, Hayashida Risa; born December 19, 1989) is a Japanese announcer, news presenter, reporter, and personality for NHK. After co-anchoring NHK's weekday evening news show NHK News 7, she took over a similar role on the network's nightly News Watch 9 in April 2023. Previously she co-hosted NHK's geographic Bura Tamori series and served a presenter for the NHK News Ohayō Nippon morning news show.

== Early years ==
Hayashida was born in Nagasaki Prefecture, which was her parents' birthplace. She was raised in Kanagawa Prefecture, Japan. She attended Shonan Shirayuri Gakuen Junior and Senior High School, founded by Sisters of Charity of St. Paul. She received the Bachelor's Degree in Music and the Master's Degree of Music from Tokyo University of the Arts in 2012 and 2014 respectively, researching musicology.

During college, Hayashida was a student newscaster on News Access (by BS Asahi) and au Headline (the news app run by au).

== Career ==
Hayashida started her broadcasting career at NHK Nagasaki Broadcasting Station in 2014. In February 2016, Hayashida was relocated to NHK Fukuoka Broadcasting Station, hosting Rokuichi! Fukuoka, following Yurie Omi. She also stars NHK News and News 845 Fukuoka.

From April 2018 Hayashida co-hosted Bura Tamori and the first part of NHK News Ohayō Nippon, both functions took over from Omi.

At midnight on January 1, 2019, Hayashida reported from Tokyo International Airport during Yukutoshi Kurutoshi, NHK's annual New Year's Eve special hosted by Kozo Takase and Mayuko Wakuda.

NHK announced on February 13, 2020, that Hayashida would step back from Bura Tamori and hand off to Rika Asano in April 2020. On March 14, she appeared her last episode of it. Hayashida also resigned from NHK News Ohayō Nippon to be the anchor for Shutoken Network airing in Tokyo Metropolis and peripheral prefectures.

In 2021, Hayashida narrated the travel segment of Taiga Drama Seiten wo Tsuke (English title: Reach Beyond the Blue Sky).

On February 9, 2022, NHK announced that Hayashida would anchor the NHK News 7 weekday evening news program from April.

On February 8, 2023, NHK announced that Hayashida would anchor the News Watch 9 9PM weekday news program from April.

On February 14, 2024, NHK announced that Hayashida would anchor the Saturday Watch 9 9PM Saturday news program from April.

On February 12, 2026, NHK announced that Hayashida would return to News Watch 9 from April 3.

== Personal life ==
Hayashida married in 2022 but entertainment news outlets reported in May 2024 that the couple divorced.

On June 7, 2026, entertainment news outlet reported that Hayashida had remarried and was pregnant with her first child. On June 18, it was revealed that her husband was saxophonist Kōhei Ueno, and that she had married him on December 24 of the previous year.

== See also ==
- Tamori

Media offices
Preceded by Yurie Omi	Bura Tamori 5th Co-Host; 2018–2020	Succeeded by Rika Asano
Preceded by Kana Nakayama	Shutoken Network Weekday Edition Anchor; 2020–2022	Succeeded by Mitsuki Uehara
Preceded by Mitsuki Uehara	NHK News 7 Weekday Edition Anchor; 2022–2023	Succeeded by Shoma Imai; Rika Kawasaki
Preceded by Izumi Yamauchi	News Watch 9 Anchor; 2023–2024	Succeeded by Makoto Hoshi
Preceded by Nonoka Akaki	Saturday Watch 9 Anchor; 2024–present	Incumbent
Preceded by Aoi Noguchi	News Watch 9 Friday Anchor; 2026–present	Incumbent
