= 70th NHK Kōhaku Uta Gassen =

- Official artwork for the 70th edition
- Also known as: The 70th NHK Red & White Year-End Song Festival
- 第70回NHK紅白歌合戦: 夢を歌おう
- Genre: Music, Variety, Special
- Created by: Tsumoru Kondo
- Directed by: Yukinori Kida
- Presented by: Teruyoshi Uchimura; Mayuko Wakuda
- Starring: Haruka Ayase; Sho Sakurai
- Judges: Naoya Inoue; Emiko Kaminuma; Sandwichman; Hinako Shibuno; Daiya Seto; Kei Tanaka; Erika Toda; Maya Nakanishi; Hiroki Hasegawa; Suzu Hirose; Akira Yoshino
- Ending theme: "Hotaru no Hikari"
- Composers: Takahiro Kaneko; Tsunaki Mihara
- Country of origin: Japan
- Original language: Japanese

Production
- Production location: NHK Hall
- Running time: 265 minutes
- Production company: NHK Enterprise Inc.

Original release
- Network: NHK-G; NHK World Premium; TV Japan
- Release: December 31, 2019

The 70th NHK Kōhaku Uta Gassen (第70回NHK紅白歌合戦, The 70th NHK Red & White Song Battle) was the 2019 edition of NHK's television special Kōhaku Uta Gassen, held on December 31 live from NHK Hall (Tokyo, Japan), and broadcast in Japan through NHK General Television and NHK Radio 1, and worldwide through TV Japan (US only) and NHK World Premium. This is the first edition in the Reiwa period. The White Team won this event.

== Events leading up to the broadcast ==
This is the last year using the theme "Let's Sing a Dream" (夢を歌おう), which remained unchanged since the 67th edition (2016), in support of the upcoming 2020 Summer Olympics and 2020 Summer Paralympics.

First details about this year's event were revealed on October 3. The event ran from 19:15 to 23:45 JST, with a 5-minute break for the latest news. NHK chairman Ryoichi Ueda declared: "First in Reiwa Period, 70th overall. I hope that the 70th Kōhaku Uta Gassen will remain in the hearts of many people, worthly of commemorative event".

On October 18, actress Haruka Ayase and Arashi member Sho Sakurai were announced as captains from Red and White Team. Teruyoshi Uchimura served as mediator for the third time in a row.

On November 11, Hinatazaka46 is announced as the first artist confirmed for this edition. The full lineup was revealed on November 14. Eight artists debuted in this edition: Official Hige Dandism, Generations from Exile Tribe, Masaki Suda, King Gnu, Kis-My-Ft2, Foorin, Hinatazaka46 and the anisong singer LiSA. Hibari Misora was revived using AI technology to perform a brand new song, "Arekara", written by Yasushi Akimoto, most notably for producing idol groups such as AKB48.

On November 22, Mariya Takeuchi was announced as a performer to celebrate the 40th anniversary of her career and perform "Inochi no Uta".

On November 25, Radwimps was announced as a performer due to great success of the animated feature Tenki no Ko.

On November 27, the Kōhaku Uratalk Channel were announced.

On December 18, the judges were announced with the voting system from last year still unchanged.

On December 20, the full song list was revealed. The performance order was revealed on December 27, with Foorin opening the show and Arashi serving as "Ootori". Rehearsals for the performances began on December 29.

== Personnel ==
=== Presenters ===
- Red Team: Haruka Ayase
- White Team: Sho Sakurai
- Moderators: Teruyoshi Uchimura & Mayuko Wakuda

Other program staff

- Kōhaku Uratalk Channel: Ryota Yamasato, Yuki Sugiura, Naomi Watanabe

=== Judges ===
- Naoya Inoue (Boxer)
- Emiko Kaminuma (Red Team captain on 45th and 46th Kōhaku)
- Sandwichman (Mikio Date, Takeshi Tomizawa)
- Hinako Shibuno (Golfer, won the 2019 Women's British Open)
- Daiya Seto (Swimmer)
- Kei Tanaka (Actor)
- Erika Toda (Main star from the 101st Asadora Scarlet)
- Maya Nakanishi (Paralympic athlete)
- Hiroki Hasegawa (Main star from Kirin ga Kuru)
- Suzu Hirose (Red Team captain on 69th Kōhaku, and Main star from the 100th Asadora Natsuzora)
- Akira Yoshino (Chemist, won the 2019 Nobel Prize in Chemistry)

=== Guests ===
- Oshiri Tantei
- Magus (Illusion act for Kaori Mizumori's collaboration performance)
- DJ Koo
- Akira Ishida
- Tōko Miura (Guest vocals on Radwimps performance)
- Shunichi Tokura (Conductor for the show's finale "Hotaru no Hikari")
- Hibari Misora (Special posthumous performance)
- Mizuki Nakamoto (performs "Into the Unknown", from Frozen 2)
- Diamond Yukai (performs "You've Got a Friend in Me", from Toy Story 4)
- Tomoya Nakamura & Haruka Kinoshita (performs "A Whole New World", from Aladdin)
- Kiss (Foreign act, hard rock band from US currently in their last world tour)
- AKB48 Group World Selections: BNK48, CGM48, SGO48, JKT48, DEL48, MNL48, Team SH & Team TP
- Shinya Kiyozuka (Piano on Aya Shimazu performance)
- Matt (Piano on Yoshimi Tendo performance)
- Mayu Kishima (Violin on Keisuke Yamauchi performance)
- Shinji Takeda (Sax on Hiroshi Itsuki performance)
- Takashi Okamura (Sax on Hiroshi Itsuki performance)
- Chico-chan (Special appearance; Drums on Hiroshi Itsuki performance)
- Chocolate Planet (Comedy team)
- Kosuke Kitajima (Assistant navigator for NHK's covearage of 2020 Olympics)
- Masako Nozawa (Voice role for Goku, Gohan & Gotenks in Dragon Ball Super)

Additional crew

- Yasushi Akimoto (Lyrics from "Arekara"; AKB48/46GROUP producer)
- Yamaha Corporation (Vocaloid:AI System & Equipments for Hibari Misora performance)
- Tsunaki Mihara & The New Breed (Additional backing track)

== Artist lineup ==
Performers

Debuting artists Returning artists Special performance

RED TEAM				WHITE TEAM			
Order	Artist	Appearance	Song	Order	Artist	Appearance	Song
First half
1	Foorin	Debut	Paprika	2	Go Hiromi	32	2 Oku 4 sen man no hitomi -Exotic Japan-
3	aiko	14	Hanabi	4	GENERATIONS from EXILE TRIBE	Debut	EXPerience Greatness
5	Hinatazaka46	Debut	Kyun	6	Junretsu	2	Junretsu no Happy Birthday
SixTONES x Snow Man - Let's Go to 2020 Tokyo
8	Shimazu Aya	6	Ito	7	Hey! Say! JUMP	4	Sukiyaki
Nakamoto Mizuki - Into the Unknown Diamond Yukai - Kimi wa Tomodachi Nakamura Tomoya x Kinoshita Haruka - Whole New World
10	Tendo Yoshimi	24	Osaka Koishigure	9	Kis-My-Ft2	Debut	Everybody Go
11	AKB48	11	Koi Suru Fortune Cookie	12	Yamauchi Keisuke	5	Kuchibiru Scarlet
14	LiSA	Debut	Gurenge	13	Miura Daichi	3	Blizzard
15	Sakamoto Fuyumi	25	Iwai Zake	16	King Gnu	Debut	Hakujitsu
17	Oka Midori	3	Kami no Tsuru	18	Fukuyama Masaharu	18	Debut 30 Shunen Chokuzen Special Medley
19	TWICE	3	Let's Dance Medley 2019	20	Itsuki Hiroshi	49	VIVA LA VIDA!
Second half
21	Little Glee Monster	3	Echo	22	DA PUMP	7	DA PUMP ~One Team Medley~
24	Keyakizaka46	4	Fukyouwaon	23	Official HIGE DANdism	Debut	Pretender
25	Mizumori Kaori	17	Takato Sakura Michi	26	King & Prince	2	King & Prince Kouhaku Medley
				27	Miyama Hiroshi	27	Bokyo Sanga
YOSHIKI x KISS - Rock and Roll All Nite
28	Sheena Ringo	7	Jinsei wa Yume Darake				
30	Nogizaka46	5	Synchronicity	29	Kanjani8	8	Kanjani Eight Medley
32	Perfume	12	FUSION	31	Hoshino Gen	5	Same Thing
Kitano Takeshi - Asakusa Kid
33	Ishikawa Sayuri	42	Tsugaru Kaikyo Fuyugeshiki	34	RADWIMPS	2	Weathering with You Kohaku Special
35	Superfly	4	Flare	36	Suda Masaki	Debut	Machigai Sagashi
Takeuchi Mariya - Inochi No Uta
37	Ikimonogakari	11	Kaze ga Fuiteiru	38	Yuzu	10	Kohaku Special Medley 2019-2020
Matsutoya Yumi - No Side
40	Matsuda Seiko	23	Seiko Best Song Medley	39	Hikawa Kiyoshi	20	Kiyoshi Genkai Toppa Special Medley
41	MISIA	4	Ai no Katachi	42	ARASHI	11	ARASHI x Kohaku Special Medley

Special performances

- Mariya Takeuchi – "Inochi no Uta"
- Yumi Matsutoya – "No Side"
- Beat Takeshi – "Asakusa Kid"

Songs performed on medleys

- Masaharu Fukuyama: "Hello", "Niji", "Zero"
- Twice: "TT -Japanese ver.-", "Fancy -Japanese ver.-"
- Da Pump: "P.A.R.T.Y. ~Universe Festival~", "U.S.A."
- King & Prince: "Cinderella Girl", "Koi-Wazurai"
- Kanjani Eight: "Zukkoke Otoko Michi", "Maemuki Scream"
- Perfume: "Fusion", "Polyrhythm"
- Radwimps: "Grand Escape", "Daijoubu"
- Yuzu: "Eikō no Kakehashi", "Seimei"
- Kiyoshi Hikawa: "Daijōbu", "Genkai Toppa x Survivor"
- Seiko Matsuda: "Jikan no Kuni no Alice", "Rock'n Rouge", "Cherry Blossom", "Natsu no Tobira"
- Misia: "Ai no Katachi", "Into the Light", "Everything"
- Arashi: "Arashi", "Turning Up"

Special performances

- Arashi – "Kite"
- Hibari Misora – "Arekara"
- Yoshikiss (Yoshiki feat Kiss) – "Rock and Roll All Nite"

Disney section – performers

- Mizuki Nakamoto – "Into the Unknown ~Kokoro no Mama ni~"
- Diamond Yukai – "Kimi wa Tomodachi (You've Got a Friend in Me)"
- Tomoya Nakamura & Haruka Kinoshita – "A Whole New World"

Not returning this year

- Red Team: Aimyon, Daoko, Kana Nishino, Yumi Matsutoya, Yoshiki ft Sarah Brightman
- White Team: Exile, Suchmos, Sandaime J Soul Brothers, Sekai no Owari, Sexy Zone, Yoshiki ft Hyde, Kenshi Yonezu.

== Voting system and results ==
The current voting system, implemented in the 69th edition (2018) was unchanged. As it was last year, the winner was determined within 3 points.

- Viewers: 1 point for the team who get more votes through 1-Seg.
- Audience: 1 point for the team who get more votes through the NHK Hall audience.
- Judges: 1 point for the team who gets 6 or more votes from 11 judges.

Voting was carried after all artists performed. The team that gets 2 or more votes were declared winner of the 70th Kōhaku.

Results
Method	Votes		Points
Method	Red Team	White Team	Points
Guest Judges	6	5	Red
NHK Hall Audience	1002	1361	White
Viewers (Japan only)	332.394	437.825	White
Winner	White Team		
