= Utacon =

- Current logo as of March 09, 2021
- Also known as: Song Concert (NHK World Premium)
- Genre: Music
- Presented by: Shōsuke Tanihara; Asa Ishibashi
- Starring: Music concerto (Live music)
- Composer: Takahiro Kaneko (Music director)
- Country of origin: Japan
- Original language: Japanese
- No. of episodes: 197

Production
- Running time: 46 Minutes (Normal Time); 73 Minutes (Specials)
- Production company: NHK Enterprises

Original release
- Network: NHK General Television; NHK World Premium; TV Japan (North America); Syndication (United States)
- Release: April 12, 2016 – present

Utacon (うたコン) is a Japanese weekly music show produced by NHK, airing on Tuesday night from April 12, 2016. The show replaces NHK Kayou Concert and Music Japan.

== Description ==
Logo used from 2016 to March 2, 2021

Utacon presents a range of music artists from Enka and J-Pop at NHK Hall in Tokyo every week, to continue in the spirit of NHK Kayou Concert (which ended on March 15, 2016) as well Music Japan (which ended on April 4, 2016, at 01:30 JST). It also airs worldwide, through NHK World Premium at 10:57 UTC, broadcast at the same time as the show's appearance on NHK-G).

To target all audiences, including traditional 60's-70's music (which was the viewing target of the now-defunct "Kayou Concert") NHK aims at the so-called "rejuvenation" of the performers, singers and music, together with the "Enka popular song" and "J-pop" styles. The program aims to become the "center of the Japanese music scene". Utacon also incorporates a relay from around Japan, making the music show a unique live experience. As was the case with "NHK Kayou Concert", the program is usually performed in front of a live audience at NHK Hall in Tokyo, but on last week each month it is performed live from NHK Osaka Hall.

The program is typically 45 minutes in length, but the premiere episode was 73 minutes long, and featured Ikimonogakari, Tatsuya Ishii, Sayuri Ishikawa, Yukino Ichikawa, Midori Oka, AKB48, Chris Hart, Saburo Kitajima, Ayaka Hirakawa, Fuyumi Sakamoto, Akira Fuse, Keisuke Yamauchi, Il Divo and Sumire.

From its premiere until March 2019, the show aired at 19:30 JST. Starting from April 2019, the show airs every Tuesday at 19:57 JST, with variety show "Sarameshi" preceding Utacon.

In March 2020, the show started to be produced without a public audience, in order to avoid the spread of COVID-19, with artists performing in remote locations. On March 9, 2021, the program debuted its new graphics and visual identity, and also started to be broadcast directly from Tokyo International Forum, as NHK Hall was temporarily closed for renovations. To mark the beginning of the new phase of the show, a special program was broadcast live from the new venue, with performances by Masashi Sada, Shizuka Kudo, Kiyoshi Hikawa, Miyuki Nakajima, Yuki Kashiwagi, Naotaro Moriyama and Yuta Orisaka, in addition to a memorial commemorating 10 years since the Great East Japan Earthquake.

On July 5, 2022, the show returned to NHK Hall.

== Staff ==
Presenters

- Shōsuke Tanihara
- Naoko Hashimoto (NHK Announcer, 2016 – 2017)
- Tomoko Kogō (NHK Announcer, 2017 – 2019)
- Chieko Katayama (NHK Announcer, 2019 – 2020)
- Nonoka Akaki (NHK Announcer, 2020 – 2025)
- Asa Ishibashi (NHK Announcer, 2025 – present)

Production Company

- NHK Enterprises

Live Orchestra

- music concerto (Conductor: Takahiro Kaneko)
