= Jun Hori =

Japanese journalist and host (born 1977)

- 堀 潤
- Born: July 9, 1977 (age 48); Hyōgo Prefecture, Japan
- Occupations: Journalist, host
- Years active: 2001–
- Agent: North Production
- Website: Official profile

Jun Hori (堀 潤, Hori Jun; born July 9, 1977, in Hyōgo Prefecture, Japan) is a Japanese journalist and host who is represented by the talent agency North Production. He presided in the news site 8bitNews. He is a former NHK announcer.

== Filmography (during NHK) ==
Okayama

Title	Network	Notes
Kibikibi Wide	NHK General	
Minyō o Tazunete		
Hiru no Sanpomichi		

Tokyo announcer

Year	Title	Network	Notes
2006	News Watch 9	NHK General	Reporter
2010	Business & Sports	NHK General	General chair
2012	Shin Sedai ga Hodoku! Nippon no Dilemma	NHK E TV	Caster

== Filmography (after NHK) ==
=== TV series ===
Year	Title	Network	Notes
2013	Asa Made Nama TV!	TV Asahi	Panelist
2013	Link! TVK Sanin-sen Kaihyō Special	TVK	Moderator
2013	#Endan	NOTTV	MC
2013	Gekiron! Colosseum: Kore de ī no ka? Nippon	TVA	MC
2013	5-ji ni Muchū!	Tokyo MX	MC
2013	TV Aichi Kaikyoku 30 Shūnenkinen 8-jikan 30-bu Special!	TVA	One-shot special
2013	Minna no Gimon News Naze Tarō	TV Asahi	News analysis
2013	Nippon Dandy	Tokyo MX	Wednesday MC
2014	Morning Cross	Tokyo MX	Main caster
2014	Zenryaku, Tsuki no ue Kara	Fuji TV	
2014	Kyōgaku! Money Scoop	Fuji TV	MC
2014	TVK News Harbor	TVK	"Jun Hori no Tsunagaru News"
2014	Mono Kura be	BS Sky PerfecTV!	

=== Radio series ===
Year	Title	Network	Notes
2013	Hōdō Suru Radio	MBS Radio	Guest
2013	Tamao Akae Tama Musubi	TBS Radio	Guest
2013	Jam the World	J-Wave	Tuesday Navigator

=== Internet series ===
Year	Title	Network	Notes
2013	Horiemon no Kozumikku-rondan	Niconico Namahōsō	
2013	Nell Mahe News 24	Niconico Namahōsō	
2013	Jun Hori no Uso wa Yurusan!	Niconico Namahōsō	
2014	Nell Mahe News Cross	Niconico Namahōsō	
