= Close-up Gendai =

- Also known as: Today's Close-up
- Genre: News
- Created by: NHK News
- Presented by: Maho Kuwako
- Narrated by: Hiroki Yasumoto (Mondays); Mikako Komatsu (Tuesdays); Kazuya Nakai (Wednesdays)
- Country of origin: Japan
- Original languages: Japanese; English (NHK World-Japan airings only)

Production
- Running time: 27 minutes

Original release
- Network: NHK
- Release: April 5, 1993 – present

Close-up Gendai (クローズアップ現代, kurozu appu gendai), also known by its English title as Today's Close-Up, is a current affairs television programme produced by the Japanese public broadcaster NHK. The programme broadcasts on Mondays through Wednesdays at 19:30 - 19:57 (UTC+9) on NHK G channel, which also airs on NHK World Premium and NHK World-Japan on a weekly basis.

The Japan Times reported in January 2016 that the NHK is considering making changes to the programme, which may include the removal of Hiroko Kuniya, who has hosted the show since its inception.

The show was returned as Close-up Gendai Plus on April 4, 2016, with the introduction of bi-anchor format.

On April 2, 2019, the Monday edition of the programme was cancelled due to cost-cutting measures by the NHK.

On April 4, 2022, the show was renamed back to Close-up Gendai after 6 years, with a new updated graphics. The Monday edition of the programme was revived after 3 years, while the Thursday edition was cancelled.

== Presenters ==
=== Presenters ===
==== Close-up Gendai (first iteration) ====
- Hiroko Kuniya (April 1993 – March 2016)

==== Close-up Gendai Plus ====
- Toshie Itō (April 2016 – March 2017)
- Tomoko Kogō (April 2016 – March 2017)
- Asahi Inoue (April 2016 – March 2017)
- Masayo Matsumura (April 2016 – March 2017)
- Yuka Kubota (April 2016 – March 2017)
- Yuki Sugiura (April 2016 – March 2017)
- Chiaki Kamakura (April 2016 – March 2019)
- Izumi Tanaka (April 2017 – March 2019)
- Shinichi Taketa (April 2017 – March 2021)
- Yũki Inoue (March 2021 – March 2022)
- Sayuri Hori (March 2021 – March 2022)

==== Close-up Gendai (second iteration) ====
- Maho Kuwako (April 2022 –July 2026)
- Makoto Hoshi (July 2026 – present)

=== Narrators ===
==== Close-up Gendai Plus ====
- Hiroshi Isobe (April 2016 – March 2017)
- Masumi Asano (April 2016 – March 2022)
- Tōru Furuya (April 2016 – March 2022)

==== Close-up Gendai (second iteration) ====
- Hiroki Yasumoto (April 2022 – present)
- Mikako Komatsu (April 2022 – present)
- Kazuya Nakai (April 2022 – present)

== International broadcast ==
The program is available on NHK World Premium and TV Japan. The program was also broadcast on NHK World-Japan with an English voice-over under the name Today's Close-up.
