= Bura Tamori =

- Genre: geography, geology, earth science
- Directed by: Varies
- Presented by: Tamori; Aoi Noguchi; Tsuyoshi Kusanagi
- Theme music composer: Yōsui Inoue

Production
- Production location: Varies
- Running time: 45 minutes

Original release
- Network: NHK General TV
- Release: 2008 – 2024

Bura Tamori (ブラタモリ; sometimes stylized as "BURATAMORI") is a Japanese weekly geographical TV series which was broadcast domestically on NHK General Television and internationally on NHK World Premium hosted by Tamori from 2008 to 2024.

In the program, Tamori, accompanied by NHK's female broadcaster, strolled Japan's cities or areas with professional or amateur geologists, local historians or curators, and explored the place's terrain features and geological changes, as well as its history, culture and civil engineering. The title came from the Japanese word 'burabura' ブラブラ, meaning wandering about, rambling, or strolling around.

The first three series of the program were broadcast late at night. In those series, Tamori could wander only within the Tokyo Metropolitan Area or in its vicinity as he was extremely busy hosting the TV program Waratte Iitomo! every weekday. In Series 4, it became a regular program to be aired on Saturdays from 7:30–8:15 p.m., covering locations nationwide. Its viewership was consistently over 10% from 2015 onward, contributing to the program being one of NHK's highest viewership programs. In 2019 special episodes from Rome and from Paris were produced.

The program also published books for some episodes that were available at major Japanese bookstores.

== History ==
The pilot version of the program was broadcast on December 14, 2008, from 0:20–1:03 a.m. JST, and the regular series began airing from 10:00 –10:43 p.m. JST on October 1, 2009. The series had 15 episodes broadcast every Thursday until March 11, 2010. Yuka Kubota became his assistant.

The second series, with 48 minutes per episode, began on October 7, 2010, and ended on March 31, 2011. It had 22 episodes.

The third series was broadcast from November 10, 2011, to April 5, 2012, with 19 episodes.

The fourth series was planned after Tamori resigned from his daily Fuji TV variety show Waratte Iitomo! in March 2014. NHK's spokesman announced on January 21, 2015, that the new series would start airing again and that Tamori would visit places outside Tokyo. The pilot episode was broadcast on January 6, 2015. Nachiko Shudo was the occasional Assistant of the episode. The regular series began airing on April 11, 2015. Each episode was 45 minutes, on Saturdays from 7:30–8:15 p.m. JST. Maho Kuwako served as next Assistant until she handed over the job to Yurie Omi in April 2016. In April 2018 Risa Hayashida took over the job of Assistant from Omi.

In 2019, it was filmed in Rome, Italy, and Paris, France. This was the first time it had been filmed outside Japan.

In April 2020, Rika Asano became the sixth Assistant.

In April 2022, Aoi Noguchi, working at Fukuoka Broadcasting Station, took over the job of Assistant from Asano.

On February 14, 2024, NHK announced in a regular press conference that it would discontinue broadcasting the program regularly in March of that year. The last episode was broadcast on March 9, 2024. A total of 263 episodes were broadcast in the series.

== Personalities ==
- Tamori — host
- Yuka Kubota — the 1st assistant (2008—2012)
- Nachiko Shudo — the 2nd assistant (2015)
- Maho Kuwako — the 3rd assistant (2015—2016)
- Yurie Omi — the 4th assistant (2016—2018)
- Risa Hayashida — the 5th assistant (2018—2020)
- Rika Asano — the 6th assistant (2020—2022)
- Aoi Noguchi — the 7th assistant (2022—2024)
- Tsuyoshi Kusanagi — narrator
- Yōsui Inoue — theme music composer

== Awards ==
- May 11, 2011: The Association of Japanese Geographers Award
- September 29, 2015: Good Design Award 2015
- June 2, 2016: The 53rd Galaxy Award
- June 8, 2016: Hoso Bunka Foundation Award
- June 16, 2017: The Geological Society Award
- March 15, 2018: FY2017 Geotechnical Engineering Contribution Award
- 2020: the 28th Hashida Award
