= Yumiko Udo =

- Born: 22 March 1969 (age 57); Ijūin Town, Kagoshima Prefecture, Japan
- Education: Kobe College
- Occupations: journalist; news anchor; television presenter
- Years active: 1991–present
- Agent: Natural Eight
- Notable credit(s): Hit Me Anyone One More Time (2019), newscaster
- Television: With MUSIC host (2024–present); news zero anchor (2018–2024); Asaichi anchor (2010–2018); Sanadamaru narrator (2016); Asadora narrator (1998); Kōhaku Uta Gassen host (2001–2003, 2012–2015), correspondent (2000, 2008, 2017); NHK News Ohayō Nippon anchor (1994–1997)

Yumiko Udo (有働 由美子, Udō Yumiko; born March 22, 1969) is a Japanese journalist, television reporter, television personality, and former NHK announcer, affiliated with Chatterbox.

== Early years ==
Udo was born in Ijūin Town (now Hioki City), Kagoshima Prefecture, Japan. At an early age she moved to Osaka, where she grew up. Failing to pass the entrance examination for Osaka University, she eventually went on to Kobe College instead.

Udo became interested in newspaper reporting when she was in fourth grade.

She was a kendo player and got a licensee of the second grade of it from the All Japan Kendo Federation. Her other hobbies included reading, traveling and cooking. She belonged to the kendo club when she was a junior and senior high school student.

== Career ==
=== As a news reporter, announcer and anchor ===
She was hired by NHK in 1991. Spending a few years as a cub sports reporter at the NHK Osaka Branch, Udo moved to Tokyo and became a news anchor for NHK News Ohayō Nippon in 1994. She worked at Saturday Sports, Sunday Sports and NHK News 10 as an anchor. She was involved in live coverage works in sport events and Olympic games.

In June 2007, Udo was moved to New York City as a correspondent. She stayed there for about two years and a half. She was promoted as Chief Announcer in June 2008. This role is held only by 15% of all announcers, around 500 men and women.

Udo became news anchor of Nippon Television's nightly news program news zero in October 2018, role that ended in March 2024.

=== Magazine interviewer ===
She has been interviewing people from all kinds of fields for magazines such as Bungei Shunjū.

=== As program host / MC ===
Udo was host of the Red Team on NHK's New Year's Eve music concert Kōhaku Uta Gassen in 2001, 2002 and 2003. She became the program's main host for the 2012, 2013, 2014 and 2015 editions.

In 2006, Udo hosted an afternoon talk show Studio Park kara Konnichiwa.

Returning to Tokyo after her stay in New York City in 2007, Udo was appointed as a main presenter for Asaichi in 2010 with Yoshihiko Inohara, a member of V6, one of Japan's most popular pop groups. Targeted mainly at women in their 40s, the show dealt with a wide variety of themes, from information about health and money, to infertility problems, menopausal disorders and the problem of sexless relationships. On March 30, 2018, Udo and Inohara left Asaichi, handing over to Yurie Omi and Hanamaru-Daikichi Hakata. She resigned from NHK on March 31.

Udo started hosting a music program on NTV, called "With MUSIC", in April 2024. "This is a full-fledged music program that will start on Nippon TV's Golden Belt for the first time in 34 years", she said about the program, which would focus not only in live music, but also in the charm of the artists shining locally and abroad. The program was scheduled to end in March 2026 due to low ratings.

On March 30, 2026, Udo became the host of the health information program "Yumiko Udo's Health Guide!" (Japanese: 有働由美子の健康案内人！, Hepburn: Udō Yumiko no kenkō an'naibito! ). The program, aired in 15-minute segments broadcast daily from Monday to Friday, focuses on providing health-related information for seniors.

=== Commercials and advertising ===
She appeared on her official 1st. commercial ad, for Mizuno Financial Group, in 2024. She had appeared before in promotional campaign ads for News Zero and NTV.

=== Event appearances ===
On November 9, 2019, Udo was a host of the national festival held to mark Emperor Naruhito's enthronement.

Udo appeared in the closing ceremony of the Osaka Expo 2025 on October 13, 2025. Her appearance together with that of Sho Sakurai resulted in many comments on SNS referring to the pair's former relationship as co-anchors in NTV's News Zero.

== Other ==
- Udo is a board member of the Japan Wheelchair Rugby Federation since 2024.

== Filmography ==
=== Television ===
Dramas

- Ten Urara (1998), narrator
- Sanada Maru (2016), narrator

Variety

- Kōhaku Uta Gassen (2001-2003) Host, (2012-2015) moderator
- with Music (2024–2026)

News and information

- NHK News Ohayō Nippon (1994–1997, 2009–2010), anchor
- Saturday Sports and "Sunday Sports" (1997-), sportscaster
- NHK News 10 (2002)
- Hello from Studio Park (2006)
- NHK News U.S. Bureau (2007-2010)
- Asaichi (2010-2018), co-main anchor (with V6's Inohara)
- News Zero (2018-2024), main anchor
- Udo Times (2024-) host

Other

- Udō Yumiko no kenkō an'naibito! (2026)

=== Film ===
- Hit Me Anyone One More Time (2019), newscaster Bonita Kondo
- Last of the Wolves (2021), radio personality

=== Radio ===
- Udo Radio (2020)

== Commercials ==
- Mizuho Financial Group (2024-) "Kigyō"
- Taiho Pharmaceutical (2024-) "Bop for Lady"
- Takara Shuzo (2024-) "Takara Fermented Distilled Sour Clear"

== Book ==
- Udouroku (Shinchosha, 2014) ISBN 978-4103366317.

Media offices
Preceded by Maoko Kotani, Mitsuyo Kusano	NHK News Ohayō Nippon Anchor; 1994–1997	Succeeded by Toko Takeuchi
First	Asaichi Anchor; 2010–2018	Succeeded by Yurie Omi
Preceded by Nobutaka Murao	news zero Anchor; 2018–2024	Succeeded by Takahiko Fujii
