= News Watch 9 =

Japanese television news program

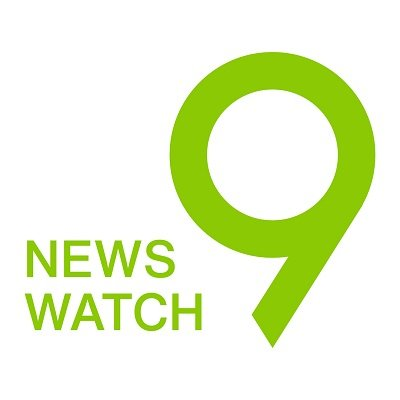
- Logo (2024-present)
- Presented by: Hitoshi Hirouchi; Aoi Noguchi; Yurika Kawaguchi
- Original languages: Japanese (main audio); English (second audio)

Production
- Production locations: NHK Broadcasting Center, Shibuya, Tokyo, Japan
- Running time: 60 minutes

Original release
- Network: NHK G NHK World Premium
- Release: April 3, 2006 – present

Related
- NHK News 9 (1993–2006); NHK News 10 (2000–2006); Saturday Watch 9

News Watch 9 (ニュースウオッチ9, Nyūsu Uotchi Nain; stylized in all caps) is the flagship evening news program of the public Japanese broadcaster, NHK. It airs weekdays on NHK general television and worldwide on NHK World Premium and is also available on the networks video-on-demand service. As of 2026, it is presented by Hitoshi Hirouchi, Aoi Noguchi and Yurika Kawaguchi. The program launched on April 3, 2006, replacing NHK News 9 and NHK News 10 as NHK's main 9:00 p.m. news program.

It is broadcast on weekdays, from 9:00 pm to 10:00 pm (JST), and features national and international news, commentary, sports and weather. Unlike most newscasts, NW9 prohibits the use of full scripts and limits the use of teleprompters.

== History ==
News Watch 9 was conceived as a part of NHK G reformatting. It replaced two news programs; NHK News 9 and NHK News 10, the former being a fifteen-minute broadcast and the latter a popular 55-minute news magazine program. Aside from consolidating the two shows into a single, one-hour newscast, the new show was put into the 9:00 pm time slot, when most Japanese are at home and awake.

The show was launched on April 3, 2006, and was presented by Hideo Yanagisawa, who provided the commentary, and newsreader, Toshie Ito. Yanagisawa left the program on October 31, 2007, due to complications of lung disease. The commentary was provided by several NHK NEWS contributors, before Hidetoshi Fujisawa joined the program two weeks later, on November 19. Ito and Fujisawa left news program on March 28, 2008.

The show was relaunched on March 31, 2008, with a new set and updated graphics, with Goro Taguchi and former News Watch sportscaster Yuko Aoyama providing commentary and news respectively. Kensuke Okoshi replaced Taguchi as commentator on March 29, 2010. In April 2011, Yuko Aoyama was replacing for Asahi Inoue. On March 30, 2015, Okoshi and Inoue are replaced by Kenji Kono and Naoko Suzuki. On April 3, 2017, they were replaced by News Check 11 hosts Maho Kuwako and Yoshio Arima, which previously they left the show. But on March 30, 2020, Kuwako was replaced by Mayuko Wakuda, who previously left NHK News Ohayō Nippon. On March 29, 2021, Arima was replaced by a former NHK Washington D.C. bureau chief, Masayoshi Tanaka.

The show was relaunched on April 4, 2022, with a new set and updated graphics. The show was switched to three-anchor format. Mayuko Wakuda position was replaced by Izumi Yamauchi. Minoru Aoi, who previously left NHK News 7, joined the show as its third anchor. On April 3, 2023, Yamauchi was replaced by Risa Hayashida. However, on January 17, 2024, Aoi quit the program and resigned from NHK, leaving only Tanaka and Hayashida as the remaining news presenter.

The show was relaunched on April 1, 2024, with new set and updated graphics. Masayoshi Tanaka and Risa Hayashida positions were replaced by Hitoshi Hirouchi and Makoto Hoshi, respectively, with Mariko Sato joined the show as its third anchor, replacing Minoru Aoi who quit NHK in January. On March 31, 2025, Sato's position was replaced by Aoi Noguchi, who previously left NHK News Ohayō Nippon as Sato moved to NHK World.

On March 30, 2026, the show was switched back to two-anchor format. Makoto Hoshi retains as anchor for Monday to Thursday, while Risa Hayashida returns as news anchor for Friday, replacing Noguchi, who was become the subtitute for both Hoshi and Hayashida; Noguchi returns as news anchor for Monday to Thursday from July 6. On August 10, Hayashida was replaced by Yurika Kawaguchi as news anchor for Friday.

=== Chronology ===
The table lists the chronology of programs 9:00 pm NHK news programs.

Title	Air date	Time slot
NHK Today's News (NHKきょうのニュース)	1961/04 - 1963/03	21:30 - 22:00 (30 min.)
NHK Today's News (NHKきょうのニュース)	1963/04 - 1964/03	21:30 - 21:40 (10 min.)
NHK NEWS (NHKニュース)	1964/04 - 1969/03	21:00 - 21:18 (18 min.)
NHK NEWS (NHKニュース)	1969/04 - 1972/03	21:30 - 21:55 (25 min.)
NHK NEWS (NHKニュース)	1972/04 - 1974/03	21:00 - 21:15 (15 min.)
NEWS CENTER 9 (ニュースセンター9時)	1974/04 - 1988/03	21:00 - 21:40 (40 min.)
NHK NEWS TODAY (NHKニュースTODAY)	1988/04 - 1988/09	21:00 - 22:20 (80 min.)
NHK NEWS TODAY (NHKニュースTODAY)	1988/10 - 1990/03	21:00 - 22:00 (60 min.)
NHK NEWS 21 (NHKニュース21)	1990/04 - 1993/03	21:00 - 22:00 (60 min.)
NHK NEWS 9 (NHKニュース9)	1993/04 - 2000/03	21:00 - 21:30 (30 min.)
NHK NEWS 9 (NHKニュース9)	2000/04 - 2006/03	21:00 - 21:15 (15 min.)
NEWS WATCH 9 (ニュースウオッチ9)	2006/04 - Present	21:00 - 22:00 (60 min.)

== Presenters ==
Main Presenters

- Hitoshi Hirouchi - Presenter (April 2024 – Present)
- Aoi Noguchi - News reader (March 2025 – March 2026, July 2026 – Present)
- Yurika Kawaguchi - News reader (August 2026 – Present)
- Hideo Yanagisawa (April 2006 - October 2007)
- Hidetoshi Fujisawa (November 2007 - March 2008)
- Toshie Itō - News reader (April 2006 - March 2008)
- Yuko Aoyama - (March 2008 - March 2011)
- Goro Taguchi (March 2008 - March 2010)
- Kensuke Ōkoshi - Presenter (March 2010 - March 2015)
- Asahi Inoue - News reader (April 2011 - March 2015)
- Kenji Kōno - Presenter (March 2015 – March 2017)
- Naoko Suzuki - News reader (March 2015 – March 2017)
- Yoshio Arima - Presenter (April 2017 – March 2021)
- Maho Kuwako - News reader (March 2017 – March 2020)
- Mayuko Wakuda - News reader (March 2020 – April 2022)
- Masayoshi Tanaka - Presenter (March 2021 – March 2024)
- Izumi Yamauchi - News reader (April 2022 – March 2023)
- Minoru Aoi - News reader (April 2022 – January 2024)
- Risa Hayashida - News reader (April 2023 – March 2024, April – August 2026)
- Mariko Sato - News reader (April 2024 – March 2025)
- Makoto Hoshi - News reader (April 2024 – August 2026)

Correspondents

- Shungo Oshio (March 2025 – Present)
- Hiromasa Ihara (March 2026 – Present)
- Mio Shiozaki (March 2026 – Present)
- Kaho Iio (March 2026 – Present)
- Masayuki Sanjō (March 2015 – March 2017)
- Daisuke Kobayashi (March 2015 – March 2017)
- Izumi Tanaka (March 2015 – March 2017)
- Nozomi Kurihara (April 2017 – April 2019)
- Sayuri Hori (April 2017 – March 2018)
- Mitsuki Uehara (April 2018 – March 2019)
- Hitoshi Fukagawa (April 2019 – March 2021)
- Makoto Hoshi (April 2019 – April 2022)
- Tomohiro Hatta (April 2020 – April 2022)
- Hikaru Urushibara (April 2021 – April 2022)
- Yōji Nakamichi (April 2021 – March 2023)
- Shuhei Takayanagi (April – September 2022)
- Hiroki Fujishige (April 2022 – March 2024)
- Tomoyuki Yazaki (April 2022 – March 2025)
- Mao Yoshioka (April 2022 – March 2023)
- Miki Toyoshima (April 2023 – March 2024)
- Emi Hatakeyama (April 2023 – March 2025)
- Daiki Takeno (April 2024 – March 2026)
- Rinka Sugaya (April 2024 – March 2026)
- Minami Himeno (March 2025 – March 2026)

Sports Presenters

- Mao Yoshioka (April 2023 – Present)
- Yuko Aoyama (April 2006 – March 2008)
- Ayako Ichinayagi (March 2008 – April 2011)
- Tomomi Hirose (April 2011 – March 2015)
- Aya Sasaki (March 2015 – March 2017)
- Tadayuki Ichihashi (April 2017 – March 2021)
- Takuya Tadokoro (March 2021 – April 2022)
- Shuhei Takayanagi (April – September 2022)
- Miki Toyoshima (April 2022 – March 2023)
- Takanobu Hayasaka (October 2022 – March 2023)

Weather

- Kimiharu Saita (April 2016 – Present)
- Mito Tanaka (March 2026 – Present)
- Nobuyuki Hirai (April 2006 – April 2011, May – June 2020)
- Hiroko Ida (April 2011 – March 2016)
- Yumi Hirano (April 2020 – June 2021)
- Ryoko Fukuoka (April – June 2020)
- Asami Kuboi (April 2023 – March 2026)

== International broadcast ==
The program is available on NHK World Premium and TV Japan. It was also available on its global news and information channel, NHK World until January 30, 2009, where it was aired with an English voice-over.
