= Tanioka =

Tanioka (written: 谷岡) is a Japanese surname. Notable people with the surname include:

- Kumi Tanioka (谷岡 久美; born 1974), Japanese video game music composer and pianist
- Kuniko Tanioka (谷岡 郁子; born 1954), Japanese politician
- Narumi Tanioka (谷岡成美; born 2002), Japanese judoka
- Shinichi Tanioka (谷岡 慎一; born 1987), Japanese announcer
