= Asahi Inoue =

Japanese announcer (born 1981)

- 井上 あさひ
- Born: 17 July 1981 (age 44); Tamano, Okayama Prefecture, Japan
- Education: Ochanomizu University Faculty of Education
- Years active: 2004–
- Employer: NHK Tokyo Announce Room
- Known for: Tottori and Hiroshima Ambassador for Promotion of Digital Terrestrial Broadcasting
- Website: Official website

Asahi Inoue (井上 あさひ, Inoue Asahi; born 17 July 1981) is an announcer for NHK.

== Biography ==
Inoue is from Tamano, Okayama Prefecture. After graduating from Okayama High School and Ochanomizu University, she joined NHK in 2004. She was a manager of the baseball club while she was in high school.

She served as Ambassador for Promotion of Digital Terrestrial Broadcasting for both the Tottori and Hiroshima stations. Since she is from Okayama Prefecture, she also had many opportunities to be appointed in regional programmes throughout the Chugoku region. She also served as an ambassador for terrestrial digital broadcasting and carried out public relations activities with female announcers of commercial stations. In an advert she wore a uniform of Hiroshima Toyo Carp and launched a terrestrial digital broadcasting promotional release. She professed that she is a Carp fan even in private.

Her hobbies are playing with her two nephews and the playing the koto. She is good at remembering people's faces, but not good at remembering their names. Since she acquired a teaching license for primary schools and junior high schools, she "I could have become an elementary school teacher if I did not become an announcer."

She usually listen to the radio often, and listens to the TBS Radio series Hikaru Ijūin: Shinya no Bakajikara on a timer and listens to it without hesitation. She even told Hikaru Ijūin himself that she is a fan of the programme.

== Programmes in charge ==
=== Former ===
- Okonomi Wide Hiroshima (caster, Apr 2006 – 13 Mar 2009)
  - In charge of replacing the casters Mikiko Yamasako in 2008.
- Chakushin Orei! Kētai Ōgiri (22 May 2006, 4 and 11 Apr 2010. Either day at late night)
- Ogenkidesuka Nipponrettō (14 Apr 2008 – Jan 2009, news in Chugoku area, in charge of replacing Yamasako)
- NHK News Ohayō Nippon (from 18 to 22 Aug 2008)
- Hyakusai Banzai! special "Life is a Challenge!" (15 Sep 2008, progress_
  - Hiring from the fact that the Hiroshima Bureau is the production secretariat. However, the programme itself was recorded in Tokyo.
- Nippon no Shoku: Furusato no Shoku (7 Mar 2009 General 10:05–11:54)
  - Nationwide broadcasting. It was broadcast as the Japan Agricultural Awards ceremony interlocking special edition and was responsible for relaying from the event venue.
- Oi, Nippon: Watashi no Sukina Tottori Ken (After Tokyo transfer)
- Kotoba Ojisan no Nattoku Nihongo Juku: Announcer no Hōgen File (Okayama's words)
- Netchū Jikan Series (2009)
- Konna Suteki na Nippon ga (occasionally, narration)
- Seikatsu hotto Morning (occasionally, reporter)
- Sanchihatsu! Tabemono Itchokusen (5 Apr 2009 – 2 Apr 2011)
- Inochi Dramatic
- News Watch 9 (caster, 4 Apr 2011 – 27 Mar 2015)
- Taira no Kiyomori (Kiyomori travelogue narration, 8 Jan – 23 Dec 2012)
- Ano Hito ni Aitai (narration, Apr 2014 – Mar 2015)
- News 630: Kyō ichi ni chi (reporter, Apr 2015 – Mar 2017)
- Kyoto News 845 (Apr 2015 – Mar 2017, took on occasionally)
- News Web (monthly, 26 Jun 2015 – 18 Mar 2016)
- Shumidoki'! "The Tea Ceremony Osenka -The First Time to Enjoy the Tea Ceremony-" (NHK E, Feb–Mar 2016) All 8 times - Listener
- Close-up Gendai Plus (caster, Apr 2016 – Mar 2017)
- NHK News 7 (22 Apr 2016 – 31 Mar 2019)
- Rekishi Hiwa Historia (weekend and public holiday caster, 8 Apr 2017 – 13 Mar 2019)
- News Today (Apr 2019 – Mar 2021)
- Nichiyo Toron (4 Apr 2021 – 27 Mar 2022)
- Humanience (1 Apr 2021 – Mar 2022)

=== Others ===
- Nikkan Sports entertainment column "AnaGura" (Wednesday in charge of May 2010)

== Synchronous female announcers ==
Everyone served as Ambassador for Promotion of Digital Terrestrial Broadcasting (ambassador of terrestrial digital broadcasting) in one of the workplaces. Boldface is the station that served as terrestrial digital ambassador.

- Miwa Araki (Saitama (agreement), **Niigata**, Tokyo Announce Room, Osaka, Nara, Radio Center (director's duties))
- Naoko Suzuki (**Takamatsu**, **Matsuyama**, Tokyo Announce Room)
- Tomomi Hirose (**Kagoshima**, Osaka, Tokyo Announce Room)
- Masayo Matsumura (Morioka, **Sapporo**, Tokyo Announce Room)
- Nami Morimoto (**Oita**, **Fukuoka**, Tokyo Announce Room)

Media offices
Preceded by Yuko Aoyama	News Watch 9 Third generation female main caster 2011–2015	Succeeded by Naoko Suzuki
Preceded by Hiroko Kuniya	Close-up Gendai Plus Host; 2016–2017	Succeeded by Shinichi Taketa
Preceded by Kozo Takase	NHK News 7 Weekend Edition Anchor; 2017–2019	Succeeded by Minoru Aoi
Preceded by Midori Nakagawa	Nichiyō Tōron Host; 2021–2022	Succeeded by Makoto Hoshi
