= Asaichi =

Japanese morning television show

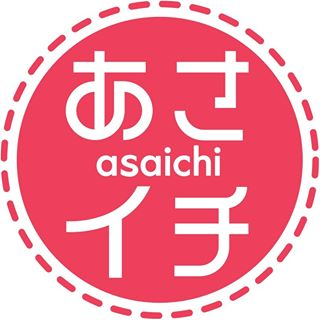
- Genre: Talk show
- Presented by: Naoko Suzuki; Hanamaru-Daikichi Hakata
- Theme music composer: TENDRE
- Country of origin: Japan
- Original language: Japanese

Production
- Executive producer: Daisaku Kawase
- Production locations: NHK Broadcasting Center, Tokyo, Japan
- Running time: 94 minutes

Original release
- Network: NHK General Television
- Release: March 29, 2010 – present

Asaichi (あさイチ) is a Japanese weekday morning talk program airing on NHK General Television, hosted by Naoko Suzuki and Hanamaru-Daikichi Hakata. It airs weekdays from 8:15 a.m. JST to 9:54 a.m. JST.

== History ==
Asaichi started on March 29, 2010, evolving from NHK General Television's original morning information program Seikatsu Hot Morning. Yumiko Udo, the-then NHK Announcer, and Yoshihiko Inohara, a member of V6, one of Japan's popular pop groups, hosted this program from the first run.

Targeting mainly women in their 40s, this program dealt with a wide variety of themes, from information about health and money, cooking tips, and living improvement tips, to infertility problems, menopausal disorders, and the problem of sexless relationships.

In April 2018, Hanamaru-Daikichi Hakata and Yurie Omi took over the job of the main presenters from Udo and Inohara.

On February 10, 2021, NHK announced that Omi would be stepping down from the main presenter at the end of March because she would be leaving NHK, and handing over her job to NHK Announcer Naoko Suzuki.

On March 30, 2021, Naoko Suzuki started her anchor job.

== Format ==
As this program begins just after Renzoku Terebi Shōsetsu aired from 8:00 a.m. to 8:15 a.m. JST, it begins with a few minutes' comments related to the drama by the presenters.

This program is divided into two sections: the first section is from 8:15 a.m. to 9:00 a.m. JST, and the second one from 9:05 a.m. to 9:54 a.m. JST. Between these sections, news headlines air from NHK's News Center. If there is breaking news during the program, it is temporarily suspended for the News Center to broadcast the news.

Fax and email are available for viewers' real-time comments or opinions when the program is on air. Some of them are read out by the anchors during the program.

=== Recurring segments ===
- In "Imaoshi! Live," Daichi Miyazaki visits a town in Japan where he reports what is hot in the town.
- "Minna! Gohandayo" is a segment by Hanamaru Hakata and Tae Komamura having advice on everyday cooking from a top-notch chef or a cooking specialist. On Fridays, it is replaced by "Green Style dayo", which is a segment by Hanamaru-Daikichi Hakata and Komamura featuring gardening tips, or "Wagamama Hobby," which features home decor.
- "Tsui-Q Rakuwaza" is a segment aired on Tuesdays in which Jun Soejima gives a quiz to presenters to inform them of life improvement tips.
- "JapaNavi" is a segment on Thursdays in which correspondents offer gourmet or other useful information from a specific place nationwide.
- "Premium Talk" is Friday's particular segment, in which the anchors have an interview with celebrities, artists, and top-notch people in the entertainment field.

== Personalities ==
=== Anchors ===
- Naoko Suzuki, co-host
- Hanamaru Hakata, co-host
- Daikichi Hakata, co-host

=== Regular contributors ===
- Tae Komamura, sub-host
- Noriko Baba, presenter
- Noriko Kamijo, correspondent
- Hanako Mori, correspondent
- Anna Nakagawa, correspondent
- Takahiro Ishii, correspondent
- Osamu Asai, correspondent
- Takashi Kobayashi, correspondent
- Akinobu Shinoyama, correspondent
- Yasuhisa Furuhara, correspondent
- Daishin Mikami, correspondent
- Tomoyuki Yazaki, correspondent
- Jun Soejima, "Quiz Tokumori" contributor
- Daichi Miyazaki, "Imaoshi! Live" contributor

=== Notable former hosts ===
- Yumiko Udo, co-host from March 2010 to March 2018, replaced by Yurie Omi.
- Yoshihiko Inohara, co-host from March 2010 to March 2018, replaced by Hanamaru-Daikichi Hakata
- Hideo Yanagisawa, co-host from March 2010 to March 2018
- Yu Uozumi, correspondent from April 2018 to March 2019
- Moeka Amemiya, correspondent from March 2016 to March 2019
- Minori Chiba, correspondent from April 2018 to November 2019, replaced by Sayuri Hori
- Naoyuki Tamura, correspondent from April 2018 to March 2020, replaced by Takahiro Ishii
- Naoko Hashimoto, correspondent from June 2019 to March 2020, replaced by Anna Nakagawa
- Yurie Omi, co-host from April 2018 to March 2021, replaced by Naoko Suzuki.
- Yohei Morita, correspondent from April 2018 to March 2021, replaced by Osamu Asai
- Tadayuki Matsuoka, correspondent from April 2019 to March 2021, replaced by Noriko Kamijo
- Kaoru Fujiwara, "Odekake Live" contributor from March 2017 to March 2021, replaced by Tomoyuki Yazaki
- Sayuri Hori, correspondent from April 2020 to March 2021, replaced by Hanako Mori

== See also ==
- Kōhaku Uta Gassen
- Asadora
