= Mayuko Wakuda =

Japanese announcer and newscaster

- 和久田 麻由子
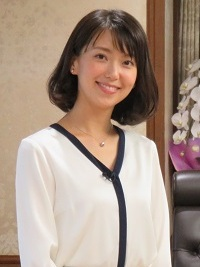
- Wakuda in August 2017
- Born: 25 November 1988 (age 37); Kanagawa Prefecture, Japan
- Education: BEc, University of Tokyo
- Occupations: News anchor; journalist
- Years active: 2011–present
- Employer(s): NHK (2011–2026); Cent. Force (2026–present)
- Television: NHK News 7 anchor (2023–2024); News Watch 9 anchor (2020–2022); NHK News Ohayō Nippon anchor (2014–2020); Darwin ga kita!—Ikimono Shindensetsu— narrator (2015–2020)
- Spouse: Undisclosed (m. 2019)
- Children: 1

Mayuko Wakuda (和久田 麻由子, Wakuda Mayuko; born November 25, 1988) is a Japanese freelance announcer and news anchor. She is a former NHK announcer and she is known as one of the anchors hosting NHK General TV's primetime news program News Watch 9. She is represented by Cent. Force.

== Early years ==
Wakuda was born in Kanagawa Prefecture, Japan. At age two, she moved with her family to Houston, Texas. She returned to Japan when she was five years old, and was raised in Kawasaki and Yokohama. Wakuda attended Joshigakuin Junior & Senior High School in Tokyo, graduating in 2007, where she belonged to a performing arts club and played straight plays and musicals in English language. She then went to University of Tokyo, one of Japan's most prestigious universities, from which she received the BEc degree in March 2011. As an undergraduate, she was a manager and trainer of the university's men's lacrosse club.

== Career ==
After graduating from University of Tokyo in 2011, Wakuda was hired by NHK. Several months later she was sent to NHK Okayama Branch where she started her career as a broadcaster.

In April 2014, Wakuda was relocated to Tokyo Announcement Room and appointed to a weekend & holiday newscaster of the morning news show NHK News Ohayō Nippon. One year later she became a weekday anchor of the show, starring every weekday from 6:00 am to 8:00 am JST.

On January 17, 2015, Wakuda was reporting from Kobe, Japan, which the Great Hanshin-Awaji Earthquake hit on that day 20 years before.

In May 2017, Wakuda conducted an interview with Masayoshi Yoshino, the minister responsible for disaster reconstruction in the Tohoku Region. In August 2017, she also interviewed with each minister newly chosen by Japanese Prime Minister Shinzo Abe in those days. Each interview was broadcast on NHK News Ohayō Nippon in the end of the month.

In the beginning of September 2018, Wakuda, together with Yurie Omi, conducted an exclusive interview with Namie Amuro, one of Japan's leading pop singers who was planning to end her musical career on September 16, 2018. This interview aired in NHK News Ohayō Nippon on September 10, 2018.

On March 17, 2019, Wakuda and Arashi member Sho Sakurai hosted the first episode of the 4-part documentary "NHK Special 'Space Spectacle'", about the latest achievements in space exploration. The pair hosted all the series, which included topics like the Hayabusa2 mission, the search for Extraterrestrial life, black holes, and the mysteries of the origin of life on Earth and it's possible start in outer space, with the last episode airing September 8, 2019.

NHK announced on February 13, 2020, that Wakuda would be stepping back from NHK News Ohayō Nippon and move to News Watch 9 in April 2020. The anchor of NHK News Ohayō Nippon was handed over to Maho Kuwako, who was at that time one of the anchors of News Watch 9.

NHK announced on February 10, 2022, that Wakuda would be stepping down from News Watch 9 and she will be in charge of special features and narration in April 2022. The anchor of News Watch 9 was handed over to Izumi Yamauchi, who was at that time one of the anchors of NHK News Ohayō Nippon.

NHK announced on February 8, 2023 that Wakuda was appointed as news anchor of NHK News 7. She left the program for maternity leave in March 2024.

She quit NHK on March 31, 2026, and became freelance announcer after signing contract with Cent. Force.

== Personal life ==
It was reported that Wakuda had gotten married in early 2019, her spouse's identity was not made public. She and her husband welcomed the birth of their first child around the summer of 2022.

== See also ==
- Kozo Takase
- Wataru Abe
- Maho Kuwako
- Yurie Omi
- Minori Chiba
- Nonoka Akaki

Media offices
Preceded by Naoko Suzuki	NHK News Ohayō Nippon Weekday Edition Anchor; 2015–2020	Succeeded by Maho Kuwako
Preceded by Maho Kuwako	News Watch 9 Anchor; 2020–2022	Succeeded by Izumi Yamauchi
Preceded by Takeshi Takigawa	NHK News 7 Anchor; 2023–2024	Succeeded by Mei Soejima
