= Shinichi Taketa =

Japanese journalist and news anchor

- 武田 真一
- Born: September 15, 1967 (age 58); Kumamoto Prefecture, Japan
- Other names: Taketan
- Education: Tsukuba University
- Occupations: freelance announcer; journalist; news anchor; television presenter
- Years active: 1990–present
- Employer: NHK (1990–2023)
- Television: Dayday. host (2023–present); Close-up Gendai Plus host (2017–2021); NHK News 7 weekday edition anchor (2008–2016)
- Title: NHK Executive Announcer
- Term: 2017–present
- Children: 2

Shinichi Taketa (武田 真一, Taketa Shin'ichi; born September 15, 1967 in Kumamoto) is a Japanese freelance journalist, announcer, news anchor, and television personality. He previously worked for NHK, having served as anchor for NHK's evening newscast NHK News 7, and the host for documentary program Close-up Gendai Plus.

== Early years ==
Taketa was born in Kumamoto Prefecture, Japan. He was square-eyed when he was a little boy.

He attended Kumamoto Prefectural Kumamoto High School and Tsukuba University, from which he received a bachelor's degree in 1990.

== Career ==
Taketa was hired by NHK in April 1990. In April 1999, he joined NHK as a presenter on the weekend noon news bulletin until 2000 before moving to the weekday bulletin, where he stayed until 2006.

From June 2006 through March 2008, Taketa was relocated to NHK Okinawa Broadcasting Station.

On March 31, 2008, Taketa returned to Tokyo Announcement Room and became the news anchor for NHK News 7 until he was transferred to Close-up Gendai Plus on April 3, 2017.

On December 31, 2016, he was a host for the 67th NHK Kohaku Uta Gassen.

From April 2017 through March 2021, Taketa was the host for Close-up Gendai Plus. On June 9, 2017, he was promoted to Executive Announcer.

In 2021, Taketa was relocated to NHK Osaka Broadcasting Station.

At the end of February 2023, Taketa left NHK, and he is now as freelance announcer. Since April 3, he became the host of Japanese morning show, Dayday., which was broadcast on Nippon TV.

== Personal life ==
Taketa has been a guitarist and fond of rock and punk music since he was a high school student. He says that The Jam, The Who, and Sex Pistols are his favorite musicians.

Taketa married a high school classmate in the 1990s and has two children.

Media offices
Preceded by Wataru Abe	NHK News 7 Weekday Edition Anchor; 2008–2016	Succeeded by Naoko Suzuki
Preceded by Asahi Inoue	Close-up Gendai Plus Host; 2017–2021	Succeeded by Yuki Inoue and Sayuri Hori
