= Maho Kuwako =

Japanese announcer and news anchor

- 桑子 真帆
- Born: 30 May 1987 (age 39); Kawasaki, Japan
- Education: Tokyo University of Foreign Studies
- Occupations: news anchor; television presenter; journalist
- Years active: 2010–present
- Employer: NHK
- Television: Close-up Gendai (NHK General TV) anchor (2022-present); NHK News Ohayō Nippon anchor (2020-2022); News Watch 9 anchor (2017–2020); News Check 11 anchor (2016–2017); Bura Tamori host (2015–2016); NHK News 7 newscaster (2015–2016); Shutoken News 845 Newscaster (2015–2016); Waratchao! (NHK BS Premium) navigator (2013–2015)
- Title: NHK Announcer
- Term: 2010–present
- Spouse: Shinichi Tanioka (m. 2017; div. 2018) Yukiyoshi Ozawa (m. 2021)

Maho Kuwako (桑子 真帆, Kuwako Maho; born May 30, 1987) is an announcer and news anchor at NHK, Japan's public broadcaster. She currently anchors NHK's Close-up Gendai current affairs program. Kuwako was born, raised, and educated in Kawasaki, Japan, and graduated from the School of Language and Culture Studies, Tokyo University of Foreign Studies (TUFS), where she majored in the Czech language.

== Career ==
Hired by NHK following her 2010 graduation from TUFS, Kuwako began her career at NHK Nagano, where she served three years as a temporary correspondent and a host for local programs. She then served in a similar capacity at NHK Hiroshima; Waratchao!, a program for preschoolers, was the first program to feature her regularly. In 2015 Kuwako was assigned to Tokyo and appointed to serve as the host's "assistant" (sidekick) on NHK's much-watched Bura Tamori travelogue, a move that boosted her profile nationally. She also appeared as a presenter on news shows like NHK News 7 and Shutoken News 845. Later Kuwako anchored News Check 11 with Yoshio Arima from April 2016 to March 2017, and from April she and Arima began anchoring News Watch 9. She stepped down from News Watch 9 in April 2020 and, trading places with Mayuko Wakuda, began anchoring NHK News Ohayō Nippon, an early-morning news program. In 2020, Kuwako narrated the closing travelogue segment of the year's Taiga Drama, Kirin ga Kuru (English title: Awaiting Kirin), and starting hosting with Takeshi Kitano the infotainment show Takeshi no Sonotoki Camera wa Mawatte Ita (Takeshi Presents: Camera Was Rolling At That Time). NHK announced on February 9, 2022, that Kuwako would leave NHK News Ohayō Nippon in April and begin hosting a revived version of Close-up Gendai, an in-depth current affairs program.

== Personal life ==
Kuwako married Shinichi Tanioka, a Fuji Television announcer, on her 30th birthday, May 30, 2017, but Sankei Sports, a tabloid, reported that the couple had divorced just a year later. Kuwako married actor Yukiyoshi Ozawa on September 1, 2021.

During interview with Sankei Sports on June 5, 2026, Kuwako announced her pregnancy of her first child.

== Filmography ==
=== Television ===
Year	Title	Notes	Ref.
2012	You-Doki Network		
2012	Greater Tokyo Area Special	Moderator	
2013	Ohayō Hiroshima		
2013	Waratchao!	Program's first "navigator". Also appeared in pilot version, which was broadcast twice in March 2013.	
2014	NHK News Ohayō Nippon	Substitute anchor	
2015	NHK News 7	Substitute weekday anchor	
2015	Bura Tamori	"Assistant"	
2016	News Check 11	Anchor	
2017	News Watch 9	Anchor	
2020	NHK News Ohayō Nippon	Weekday anchor	
2020	Takeshi no Sonotoki Camera wa Mawatte Ita	Host	
2022	73rd NHK Kōhaku Uta Gassen	Host	
2022	Close-up Gendai	Host	
2025	Everyone's Best Kouhaku 100th Anniversary of Broadcasting Special	Host	

== Radio ==
Year	Title	Notes	Ref.
2012	Koko wa furusato Tabisuru Radio		

== See also ==
- Tamori
- Yurie Omi
- Kozo Takase

Media offices
Preceded by Nachiko Shudo	Bura Tamori 3rd Co-Host; 2015–2016	Succeeded by Yurie Omi
Preceded by Naoko Suzuki	News Watch 9 Anchor; 2017–2020	Succeeded by Mayuko Wakuda
Preceded by Mayuko Wakuda	NHK News Ohayō Nippon Weekday Edition Anchor; 2020–2022	Succeeded by Nachiko Shudo
Preceded by Yuki Inoue and Sayuri Hori	Close-up Gendai Host; 2022–present	Incumbent
