= List of Japanese-language television channels =

The following is a list of Japanese-language television channels.

== Philippines (Proposed) ==
Country	Name	Owner	Launched
(Philippines)	Kapamilya Japanese	ABS-CBN Corporation (Nippon TV)	TBD (Nationwide)
(Philippines)	PTV 2 Japanese	People's Television Network (NHK)	TBD (Nationwide)
(Philippines)	TV5 Japanese	TV5 Network (Fuji Television)	TBD (Nationwide)
(Philippines)	GMA 2 Japanese	GMA Network (TBS)	TBD (Nationwide)
(Philippines)	RPN 2 Japanese	Radio Philippines Network (TV Asahi)	TBD (Nationwide)
(Philippines)	IBC 2 Japanese	Intercontinental Broadcasting Corporation (TV Tokyo)	TBD (Nationwide)

== Other countries ==
Country	Name	Owner	Notes
(United States) (Hawaii)	KIKU	WRNN-TV Associates	
(United States) (Hawaii)	Nippon Golden Network		Oceanic Cable
(United States) (California)	KSCI	WRNN-TV Associates	Channel 18
(United States) (California)	KCNS	WRNN-TV Associates	Channel 38
(United States) (California)	KXLA	Rancho Palos Verdes Broadcasters, Inc.	Channel 44
(United States) (California)	KTSF	Lincoln Broadcasting Company	Channel 26
(United States) (New York (state))	WMBC-TV	Mountain Broadcasting Corporation	Channel 18
US	TV Japan	NHK Cosmomedia America Inc.	Channel may vary with services
US	Jme	NHK Cosmomedia America Inc.	Channel may vary with services
Europe, the Middle East, Russia and North Africa	JSTV		Japan Satellite Television (Hot Bird 6, Encrypted in Cryptoworks)
