= Naoko Suzuki =

Japanese journalist and news anchor

- 鈴木 奈穂子
- Born: January 29, 1982 (age 44); Yokohama, Japan
- Education: Hosei University
- Occupations: journalist; news anchor; announcer; television presenter
- Years active: 2004–present
- Employer: NHK
- Television: Asaichi anchor (2021–present); NHK News 7 anchor (2017–2019); News Watch 9 anchor (2015–2017); NHK News Ohayō Nippon anchor (2010–2015); Shutoken Network anchor (2008–2010)
- Title: NHK Announcer
- Term: 2004–present
- Spouse: Unknown (m. 2012)
- Children: 1

Naoko Suzuki (鈴木 奈穂子, Suzuki Naoko; born January 29, 1982) is a Japanese news anchor and television personality for NHK. She is the anchor of NHK's morning talk show Asaichi.

== Early years ==
Suzuki was born in Yokohama, Japan. She has a younger sister.

During her elementary school years, she attended three schools due to her father's work demands.

She attended Hosei University and received a bachelor's degree in social sciences. During college, Suzuki joined Hosei University's Jishu Masukomi Kouza (Independent Mass Media Course). She attended announcer schools of NTV Events Inc. and TV-Asahi Ask Co. Ltd. to experience broadcasting.

== Career ==
Suzuki had odd jobs during her university period. Though she had previously considered entering the work force as an announcer, it was after receiving a comment by one of her professors in the independent course that she seriously considered becoming one.

Suzuki was hired by NHK in April 2004. She started her career at the NHK Takamatsu Broadcasting Station in the rural area of Takamatsu, Kagawa Prefecture, where she lived alone after living with her family in the Kanto region. Two years later, she was relocated to Matsuyama Broadcasting Station in Matsuyama, Ehime Prefecture. She served as Ambassador for Promotion of Digital Terrestrial Broadcasting for both of these stations and Okayama Broadcasting Station.

In 2008, Suzuki was relocated to NHK Tokyo's Announcer Department to be the anchor of the regional TV program Shutoken Network, which aired exclusively in Tokyo and peripheral prefectures.

From March 2010, she was the anchor of NHK News Ohayō Nippon until March 2015.

Suzuki then served as the anchor of News Watch 9 from March 2015 for two years.

In April 2017, Suzuki became the anchor of the weekday edition of the primetime news show NHK News 7, which was considered as one of NHK's most highlighted news programs.

From October to November 2018, she was suddenly absent from the program because of sickness.

In 2019 she decided to step down the anchoring post for maternity leave.

Suzuki returned to NHK to host its morning infotainment program Asaichi replacing Yurie Omi on March 29, 2021.

She was announced as part of the 77th NHK Kōhaku Uta Gassen (2026) broadcast.

== Personal life ==
Suzuki married Yuichiro Yokoi, a programming director working for TBS on November 22, 2012. They met while studying in the Independent Mass Media Course at Hosei She gave birth to a daughter on May 18, 2019.

== Filmography ==
=== News and infotainment programs ===
Year	Title	Role	Note	Ref.
2007	Tankenroman Sekai Isan	Reporter		
2007	Holiday Interview	Interviewer		
2008	Kore Koso Wagamachi Genkidama		Regional support program	
2008	Konichiwa itto 6 ken			
2008	Shutoken News 845			
2008–2010	Shutoken Network			
2009	Ogenki Desu ka Nippon Rettō		Multi–section information program	
2010–2015	NHK News Ohayō Nippon			
2015–2017	News Watch 9			
2017–2019	NHK News 7			
2021	Asaichi			

=== Variety and music programs ===
Year	Title	Role	Note	Ref.
2006	Midnight Channel "Mezase! Big Hit ~Shikoku de Umareta Pops and Rock~"	Announcer/host		
2006	Tabemono Shinseki			
2006	NHK Digital Broadcast Transmission Start Special (全国スタート!地上デジタル放送)			
2008	Mou Sugu 8ji Pre Map		5–minute future program digest and information	
2008	Idea taiketsu zenkoku kōtō senmon gakkō robot contest''	Narrator	Robot competition	
2008, 2009	NHK Mini-Mini Video Awards	Host		
2009	Doyō Studio Park–Anata no koe ni kotaemasu	Reporter		
2009	Deep People	Interviewer		
2009	The Coach: Jinsei no kyōkasho (ザ・コーチ 人生ノ教科書)	Anchor		
2024	75th NHK Kōhaku Uta Gassen	Announcer/host		
2025	76th NHK Kōhaku Uta Gassen	Announcer/host		
2026	77th Kōhaku Uta Gassen	Announcer/host		

=== Drama and drama related programs ===
Year	Title	Role	Note	Ref.
2009	2009 Taiga Drama 'Tenchijin' PR			

=== Sports programs ===
Year	Title	Role	Note	Ref.
2006	2006 FIFA World Cup			

Media offices
Preceded by Yuriko Shimazu	NHK News Ohayō Nippon Anchor; 2010–2015	Succeeded by Mayuko Wakuda
Preceded by Asahi Inoue	News Watch 9 Anchor; 2015–2017	Succeeded by Maho Kuwako
Preceded by Shinichi Taketa	NHK News 7 Weekday Edition Anchor; 2017–2019	Succeeded by Takeshi Takigawa
Preceded by Yurie Omi	Asaichi Anchor; 2021–present	Incumbent
