= Kozo Takase =

Japanese announcer and news anchor for NHK (born 1975)

- Born: 26 December 1975 (age 49); Kakogawa, Hyogo Prefecture, Japan
- Education: Waseda University
- Occupations: journalist; announcer; news anchor
- Years active: 1999–present
- Employer: NHK
- Television: News Live! Yu Goji anchor (2022–present); NHK News Ohayō Nippon anchor (2017–2022) newscaster (2008–2010); NHK News 7 weekend host (2016–2017) weekend sub presenter (2011–2016); News Shibu Goji news reader (2015–2016); Kokkai Chukei reporter and director (2010–2011); Gekkan Toretate My Video (2009–2010)
- Title: NHK Announcer
- Term: 1999–present
- Spouse: Misaki Kawano (m. 2003)

Kozo Takase (高瀬 耕造, Takase Kōzō, born December 26, 1975) is a Japanese announcer and news anchor for NHK.

== Early years ==
Born and raised in Kakogawa, Hyogo Prefecture, Japan, Takase graduated from Waseda University. He belonged to a glee club as an undergraduate.

== Career ==
Takase was hired by NHK in April 1999, and started his career at NHK Niigata Branch.

In April 2008, Takase was moved to Tokyo Announcement Room and appointed as a biweekly newscaster of NHK's morning news show NHK News Ohayō Nippon, where he starred from 4:30 to 5:55 am until March 2010. He also hosted Gekkan Toretate My Video from April 2009 to March 2010. From April 2010 to March 2011, he was involved in reporting from Diet.

In April 2011, Takase joined NHK News 7 as an assistant newscaster, starring on weekends until April 2012. He then became a newsreader for the news program aired at noon. In May 2015, he also presented at News Shibu Goji as a newsreader. From April 2016 to April 2017, he was an anchor of NHK News 7 for the weekend.

In April 2017, Takase was appointed the main presenter for NHK News Ohayō Nippon, where he anchored with Mayuko Wakuda and Maho Kuwako.

On February 9, 2022, NHK announced that Takase was supposed to step down from the job of the anchor of NHK News Ohayō Nippon together with Kuwako in April. He will host the evening program News Live! Yu Goji from April.

== Personal life ==
When Takase worked for NHK Niigata Branch, he met and married Misaki Kawano around December 2003, who was an announcer for Television Niigata Network.

Media offices
Preceded by Taisuke Yokoo	NHK News Weekday Afternoon Edition Anchor; 2012–2016	Succeeded by Takeshi Takigawa
Preceded by Nami Morimoto	NHK News 7 Weekend Edition Anchor; 2016–2017	Succeeded by Asahi Inoue
Preceded by Wataru Abe	NHK News Ohayō Nippon Weekday Edition Anchor; 2017–2022	Succeeded by Masayuki Sanjo
