= Chatterbox =

Chatterbox may refer to:

== Characters ==
- Mr. Chatterbox, in the Mr. Men children's book series
- Little Miss Chatterbox, in the Little Miss children's book series
- Chatterbox, a member of the fictional disaster squad Ro-Busters
- Chatterbox, a puppet who appears with Australian children's musical group Hi-5

== Movies and television ==
- Chatterbox (1936 film), starring Anne Shirley
- Chatterbox (1943 film), starring Joe E. Brown
- Chatterbox (1977 film), a comedy film about a woman with a talking vagina
- Chatterbox (1993 film), a film by Liu Miaomiao
- Chatterbox, a puppet on the Hi-5 TV series (Australia, America, United Kingdom, Philippines and Indonesia)
- "The Chatterbox", an episode from the American TV series The Nanny
- Episode from Peppa Pig.

== Music ==
- Chatterbox (band), an American industrial music band
- Chatterbox Records, an Australian-based record label
- Chatterbox (album), a 1990 demo for the band Toadies

== Printed media ==
- Chatterbox, a political column written by Timothy Noah
- Chatterbox, a children's weekly paper founded in 1866 by John Erskine Clarke
- Chatterbox, a games forum published daily in The Guardian newspaper

== Other uses ==
- Chatterbox (restaurant), a restaurant in Singapore
- Chatterbox Falls, a waterfall in Princess Louisa Inlet, British Columbia, Canada
- Chatterbot or chatterbox, a computer bot which attempts to maintain a conversation with a person
- Paper fortune teller, an origami also called a "chatterbox"
- An informal term for a talkative person, sometimes a compulsive talker
- Chatterbox FM, a fictional talk radio station in the video game series Grand Theft Auto
- SCORE (satellite), a communications satellite nicknamed "Chatterbox"
- Chatterbox (Japanese talent agency)
