= Wataru Abe =

Japanese announcer

- Born: October 7, 1967 (age 58); Mizusawa, Iwate, Japan
- Education: B.L., Waseda University
- Occupation: Executive Announcer
- Years active: 1990–present
- Employer: NHK
- Notable credit(s): Gogonama anchor (2017–present); NHK News Ohayō Nippon anchor (2008–2017); NHK News 7 anchor (2006–2008)
- Title: NHK Executive Announcer
- Term: 2017–present

Wataru Abe (阿部 渉, Abe Wataru; born October 7, 1967) is a Japanese announcer, television reporter, television personality, and news anchor for NHK. Abe is a host for NHK's evening talk show Gogonama. From 2008 until 2017 he was a news anchor for NHK's morning news show NHK News Ohayō Nippon.

== Early years ==
Born in Mizusawa, Iwate, Japan, Abe went on to Waseda University, where he received the bachelor's degree of laws in 1990.

== Career ==
Graduated from Waseda University in 1990, Abe was hired by NHK. His first position was a trainee at NHK Akita Branch in Akita Prefecture, Japan, where he started his broadcasting career as a newsreader for local news headlines and weather news.

He was relocated to NHK Yokohama Branch in Yokohama.

His debut for nationwide news program was the weekend news anchor for NHK News 7 in April 2000. He served one year for this program.

On December 31, 2000, Abe was involved in live coverage for NHK's year-end music show Kōhaku Uta Gassen on NHK Radio. In 2001 and 2004, he played a role of the host for the white team (shirogumi) at Kōhaku Uta Gassen. In 2009 and 2011, he became the leading host for the program. In addition, he was a narrator for Taiga drama Toshiie to Matsu in 2002; he was the host for the opening ceremony of Expo 2005 in Aichi Prefecture on Japan's behalf in March 2005; and he was the host for Sunday Studio Park from April 2005 until March 2006.

From April 2006 until March 2008, Abe was the weekday anchor for NHK News 7. In March 2008, he was appointed weekday anchor for NHK News Ohayō Nippon, in which he served until March 2017.

In April 2017, Abe handed over the job of the news anchor for NHK News Ohayō Nippon to Kozo Takase and became host for NHK's evening infotainment talk show Gogonama with actor Eiichiro Funakoshi and actress Jun Miho. On June 9, 2017, Abe was promoted to Executive Announcer.

In April 2020, Abe resigned from Gogonama and became the anchor for News Shibugoji.

== See also ==
- Eiichiro Funakoshi
- Jun Miho

Media offices
Preceded by Shinichi Taketa	NHK News Weekend Afternoon Edition Anchor; 2000–2001	Succeeded by Tomoki Deyama
Preceded by Satoshi Hatakeyama	NHK News 7 Weekday Edition Anchor; 2006–2008	Succeeded by Shinichi Taketa
Preceded by Tsuyoshi Matsuo	NHK News Ohayō Nippon Weekday Edition Anchor; 2008–2017	Succeeded by Kozo Takase
First	Gogonama Host; 2017–2020	Succeeded by Koji Komatsu
Preceded by Tsuyoshi Matsuo	News Shibugoji Anchor; 2020–present	Incumbent
