= NHK News 7 =

Japanese television news program

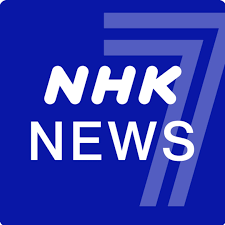
- Also known as: NEWS 7
- Created by: Yasushi Seito
- Presented by: Yoji Itoi (Monday-Thursday); Mei Soejima (Monday-Thursday); Shōma Imai (Friday-Sunday); Erika Morishita (Friday-Sunday)
- Theme music composer: Toshiyuki Omori
- Country of origin: Japan
- Original languages: Japanese (Main audio); English (on audio subchannel)

Production
- Production locations: NHK Broadcasting Center, Shibuya, Tokyo, Japan
- Camera setup: Multi-camera
- Running time: 30 minutes (more than 2 hours, special coverage only)

Original release
- Network: NHK G NHK World Premium; NHK World-Japan
- Release: April 5, 1993 – present

Related
- News Watch 9

NHK News 7 (Japanese: NHKニュース7; also known and stylized in English as NEWS 7) is the early evening news program broadcast domestically on NHK General TV and internationally on NHK World Premium. It has been on the air daily since April 5, 1993, from 7:00pm to 7:30pm (JST).

== History ==
It started broadcasting in its current form on April 5, 1993. For about 20 years, the main news service on NHK was at 9pm, but the corporation decided to move the main news to 7pm as part of reforms.

== Chronology ==
Air date	Weekdays	Saturdays	Sundays
1993.04.05 - 1996.03.31	19:00 - 19:57（57 min.）	19:00 - 19:27（27 min.）	19:00 - 19:20（20 min.）
1996.04.01 - 1998.03.29	19:00 - 19:40（40 min.）	19:00 - 19:27（27 min.）	19:00 - 19:20（20 min.）
1998.03.30 - 2000.03.26	19:00 - 19:57（57 min.）	19:00 - 19:27（27 min.）	19:00 - 19:20（20 min.）
2000.03.27 - 2000.10.01	19:00 - 19:35（35 min.）	19:00 - 19:30（30 min.）	19:00 - 19:20（20 min.）
2000.10.02 - 2004.03.28	19:00 - 19:30（30 min.）		19:00 - 19:20（20 min.）
2004.03.29 - present	19:00 - 19:30（30 min.）		

== Anchors ==
NEWS 7 chronology of newscasters and weather presenters
Date		Newscaster			Weather information			
Date		Weekdays		Weekends	Mon. - Wed.	Thu. - Fri.	Saturday	Sunday
1993.4.5	1994.4.3	Yoshiaki Kawabata/Yoko Sakurai		Miyuki Morita	Hitoshi Takada		(vacant)	
1994.4.4	1995.4.2	Yoshiaki Kawabata/Yoko Sakurai		Osamu Miyata	Koji Murayama		(vacant)	
1995.4.3	1996.3.31	Miyuki Morita		Osamu Miyata	Koji Murayama		(vacant)	
1996.4.1	1997.3.30	Miyuki Morita		Osamu Miyata	(vacant)		(vacant)	
1997.3.31	1998.3.29	Miyuki Morita		Osamu Miyata	(vacant)		(vacant)	
1998.3.30	1999.3.28	Miyuki Morita		Osamu Miyata	Akihiko Taguchi	Hitoshi Takada	(vacant)	
1999.3.29	2000.3.26	Miyuki Morita		Satoshi Hatakeyama	Akihiko Taguchi	Hitoshi Takada	(vacant)	
2000.3.27	2000.10.1	Satoshi Hatakeyama		Norio Ishizawa	Nami Fujii	Naoko Shimazu		(vacant)
2000.10.2	2002.9.29	Satoshi Hatakeyama		Norio Ishizawa	Nami Fujii	Naoko Shimazu		(vacant)
2002.9.30	2003.3.30	Satoshi Hatakeyama		Norio Ishizawa	Nami Fujii	Eriko Arashima		(vacant)
2003.3.31	2004.3.28	Satoshi Hatakeyama		Hirohide Itō	Nami Fujii	Eriko Arashima		(vacant)
2004.3.29	2005.3.27	Satoshi Hatakeyama		Masao Sueda	Sae Nakarai		Eriko Arashima	
2005.3.28	2006.4.2	Satoshi Hatakeyama		Masao Sueda	Sae Nakarai		Shiori Yamamoto	
2006.4.3	2008.3.30	Wataru Abe		Masao Sueda	Sae Nakarai		Shiori Yamamoto	
2008.3.31	2011.4.3	Shinichi Taketa		Masaiko Nomura	Sae Nakarai		Shiori Yamamoto	
2011.4.4	2012.4.1	Shinichi Taketa		Tomoko Kogo	Natsumi Terakawa		Mamiko Okamura	
2012.4.2	2014.3.30	Shinichi Taketa		Tomoko Kogo	Mamiko Okamura		Natsumi Terakawa	
2014.3.31	2014.8	Shinichi Taketa		Nami Morimoto	Mamiko Okamura		Natsumi Terakawa	
2014.9	2014.12.23	Shinichi Taketa		Nami Morimoto	Natsumi Terakawa		Mamiko Okamura	
2014.12.24	2015.3.29	Shinichi Taketa		Nami Morimoto	Natsumi Terakawa		（vacant）	
2015.3.30	2016.4.3	Shinichi Taketa		Nami Morimoto	Natsumi Terakawa		Mai Kikuchi	
2016.4.4	2017.4.2	Shinichi Taketa		Kozo Takase	Ryōko Fukuoka		Mai Kikuchi	
2017.4.3	2017.11.5	Naoko Suzuki		Asahi Inoue	Ryōko Fukuoka		Mai Kikuchi	
2017.11.6	2018.2.25	Naoko Suzuki		Asahi Inoue	Mai Kikuchi		Ran Watanabe	
2018.2.26	2018.4.1	Naoko Suzuki		Asahi Inoue	Yūmi Hirano		Ran Watanabe	
2018.4.2	2019.3.31	Naoko Suzuki		Asahi Inoue	Yūmi Hirano		Mika Kunimoto	
2019.4.1	2020.3.29	Takeshi Takigawa		Minoru Aoi	Yūmi Hirano		Mika Kunimoto	
2020.3.30	2021.3.28	Takeshi Takigawa		Minoru Aoi	Yūmi Hirano		Miku Nakamura	
2021.3.29	2021.12.12	Takeshi Takigawa		Minoru Aoi	Akari Yamagami	Kōjirō Mukasa	Kōjirō Mukasa	
2021.12.13	2022.4.3	Takeshi Takigawa		Minoru Aoi	Akari Yamagami	Kōjirō Mukasa	Kōjirō Mukasa	
2022.4.4	2023.4.2	Takeshi Takigawa		Masatomo Takai	Ayane Hareyama		Kōjirō Mukasa	
Date		Newscaster			Weather information			
Date		Mon. - Thu.	Fri.	Weekends	Weekdays		Weekends	
2023.4.3	2024.3.31	Mayuko Wakuda/Takeshi Takigawa	Shōma Imai/Erika Morishita		Ayane Hareyama		Kōjirō Mukasa	
2024.4.1	2026.3.29	Yōji Itoi/Mei Soejima	Shōma Imai/Erika Morishita		Ayane Hareyama		Kōjirō Mukasa	
2026.3.30		Yōji Itoi/Mei Soejima	Shōma Imai/Erika Morishita		Nao Kondō		Kōjirō Mukasa	

== International broadcast ==
The program is aired internationally on NHK World Premium (except in North America where it is aired on TV Japan instead), in its entirety in Japanese, with English second audio program (SAP) available and NHK World-Japan in English audio. The program also airs in Australia on SBS WorldWatch nightly at 11pm (AEST/AEDT).
