= Minori Chiba =

Japanese female announcer for NHK

- Born: 1 December 1988 (age 36); Miyagi Prefecture, Japan
- Education: Hosei University
- Occupation: NHK Announcer (2012–present)
- Years active: 2012–present
- Notable credit(s): Asaichi correspondent (2018–2019); NHK News Ohayō Nippon navigator (2017–2018)
- Spouse: 1

Minori Chiba (千葉 美乃梨, Chiba Minori, born December 1, 1988) is a Japanese female announcer for NHK. She was born in Miyagi Prefecture, Japan.

== Career ==
Graduating from Hosei University, Chiba was hired by NHK in 2012 as Announcer. She worked for NHK Yamagata Branch from 2012 to 2015, and NHK Sendai Branch from 2015 to 2017.

In April 2017, Chiba moved to Tokyo and joined NHK News Ohayō Nippon. She became one of navigators for this program's "Machikado Jōhōshitsu (Street Information Room)" segment, where she introduced inventions that helped make people's life more convenient. She is a reporter for its "Shuntaikan" segment on the last Sunday of every month.

Chiba is also a main presenter for Sandwichman's Tenshi no Tsukuriwarai aired on NHK Radio 1.

On February 21, 2018, NHK announced that Chiba was leaving NHK News Ohayō Nippon in March 2018. She joined live infotainment program Asaichi in April 2018 as Correspondent.

On October 16, 2019, it was reported by various news sources that Chiba was an expectant mother. On Asaichi broadcast on November 6, she announced that she was going on maternity leave.

In September 2020, Chiba was moved back to NHK Sendai Branch.
