= Shinichi Tanioka =

Japanese announcer for Fuji Television (born 1987)

- 谷岡 慎一
- Born: 16 February 1987 (age 39); Kōchi Prefecture, Japan
- Education: Hosei University School of Business
- Occupation: Announcer
- Years active: 2010– present
- Employer: Fuji Television
- Television: Current; CS Pro Yakyū News; Swallows Baseball L!ve; Minna no Keiba; Former; FNN Super News
- Spouse: Maho Kuwako (m. 2017; div. 2018) Unknown (m. 2020)

Shinichi Tanioka (谷岡 慎一, Tanioka Shin'ichi; born 16 February 1987) is a Japanese announcer for Fuji Television.

== Personal life ==
On May 11, 2017, he officially married Maho Kuwako, an NHK announcer. The Sankei Sports newspaper wrote that Tanioka and Kuwako were divorcing just one year after their marriage. Tanioka announced that he remarried in November 2020 to an unnamed spouse.

== Current programmes ==
Year	Title	Notes
	Non Stop!	
	CS Pro Yakyū News	
	Swallows Baseball L!ve	
	Minna no Keiba	
2016	VS Arashi	Voice of 5th generation, changes weekly on an irregular basis

In the broadcast on 23 March 2017, he appeared as part of Fuji TV male announcers team and did the commentary during the 3rd game Pinball Runner.

== Former appearances ==
Year	Title	Role	Notes
2010	FNN Super News		Field caster on Monday and Tuesday
2012	FNN News		Soccer women's Algarve Cup "Japan × America" inside the relay
2012	FNN Super News Weekend		Akihiro Nagashima for summer vacation; Sports Corner
	Lovely Muco	Komatsu-san	Seasons 1 and 2

== Horse Racing GI Live history ==
Year	Horse	Ref.
2016	February Stakes	
2016	Victoria Mile	
