= Hiroshi Miyama =

Japanese enka singer (born 1980)

Hiroshi Miyama 三山 ひろし
- Born: Masaaki Tsuneishi; 17 September 1980 (age 45); Nankoku, Kōchi, Japan
- Genres: Enka
- Occupation: Singer
- Years active: 2009–
- Label: Nippon Crown
- Website: Official website

Hiroshi Miyama (三山 ひろし, Miyama Hiroshi; born 17 September 1980, in Nankoku, Kōchi) is a Japanese enka singer. His real name is Masaaki Tsuneishi (恒石 正彰, Tsuneishi Masaaki).

Miyama's voice gives people a sense of security and vitality ανδ is called "Vitamin Voice" (ビタミンボイス, Bitamin Boisu).

== Discography ==
=== Studio albums ===
Title	Details	Peak
Title	Details	JPN
Utai Tsugu! Shōwa no Hayariuta	Released: 15 March 2010; Label: Nippon Crown	187
Utai Tsugu! Shōwa no Hayariuta II	Released: 14 February 2011; Label: Nippon Crown	252
Utai Tsugu! Shōwa no Hayariuta III	Released: 20 February 2012; Label: Nippon Crown	171
Utai Tsugu! Shōwa no Hayariuta IV	Released: 18 February 2013; Label: Nippon Crown	160
Utai Tsugu! Shōwa no Hayariuta V	Released: 20 January 2014; Label: Nippon Crown	128
Utai Tsugu! Shōwa no Hayariuta VI	Released: 25 May 2015; Label: Nippon Crown	64
Utai Tsugu! Shōwa no Hayariuta VII	Released: 23 May 2016; Label: Nippon Crown	59
Utai Tsugu! Shōwa no Hayariuta VIII	Released: 22 May 2017; Label: Nippon Crown	29
Utai Tsugu! Shōwa no Hayariuta IX	Released: 14 May 2018; Label: Nippon Crown	42

=== Compilation albums ===
Title	Details	Peak
Title	Details	JPN
Hiroshi Miyama First Best: Ayame Ujō Hito Koisakaba	Released: 17 November 2014; Label: Nippon Crown	60
Hiroshi Miyama Full Music Collection: Oiwaki-yama Hito Koisakaba	Released: 7 October 2015; Label: Nippon Crown	66
Hiroshi Miyama Full Music Collection: Shimanto-gawa Oiwaki-yama	Released: 7 September 2016; Label: Nippon Crown	55
Hiroshi Miyama Full Music Collection: Otoko no Ryūgi Shimanto-gawa	Released: 20 November 2017; Label: Nippon Crown	52

=== Cover albums ===
Title	Details	Peak
Title	Details	JPN
En Kashū Hiroshi Miyama: Onshi Norimasa Nakamura o Utau	Released: 15 July 2013; Label: Nippon Crown	215
Wandering Life of a Gambler: Famous Enka Song Compilation	Released: 20 June 2014; Label: Nippon Crown	90
Miyama de Anime: Hiroshi Miyama Sings National Anime Songs	Released: 14 August 2017; Label: Nippon Crown	240

=== Singles ===
Title	Year	Peak	Certifications
Title	Year	JPN	Certifications
"Hito Koisakaba"	2009	17	RIAJ: Gold
"Yoi-machi Sakaba"	2010	20	
"Danchone Minatochō"	2011	23	
"Onna ni Umarete"	2011	22	
"Otoko no Uso"	2012	21	
"Otoko no Uso" (5th Anniversary Limited Edition)	2013	21	
"Ayame Ujō"	2014	19	
"Oiwaki-yama"	2015	13	RIAJ: Gold
"Shimanto-gawa"	2016	11	RIAJ: Gold
"Haha o Omoeba" (with Saburō Kitajima)	2016	–	
"Otoko no Ryūgi"	2017	13	
"Igosso Tamashī"	2018	12	
"Kita no Onna Machi"	2020	9	

=== Videography ===
	Year	Title
1st	2012	Hiroshi Miyama: First Concert –Enka no Yoake–
2nd	2014	Hiroshi Miyama 5-Shūnen Concert in Gotanda Yūpōto

== Filmography ==
=== Television ===
Year	Title	Network	Ref.
	NHK Kayō Concert	NHK	
	BS Nippon no uta	NHK BS	
	Sub-chan to Uta Nakama	TV Tokyo	
	Genki-ya Honpo	KSS	
	Shin Heisei Kayō Juku	BS Asahi	
2015	Knight Scoop	ABC	
	Enka Danshi. 2	Kayō Pops Channel	
2023	Ranman	NHK	

==== NHK Kōhaku Uta Gassen appearances ====
Year / Broadcast no.	Appearance no.	Song	Order	Opponent
2015 / 66th	1st	"Oiwaki-yama"	3/26	Nogizaka46
2016 / 67th	2nd	"Shimanto-gawa –Kendama Taishi-hen–"	3/23	Keyakizaka46

=== Radio ===
Title	Network
Kirameki Kayō Live	NHK FM Broadcast
Enka Samurai	Radio Nippon
Yutaka Natsuki no Hotto Kayōkyoku	Radio Nippon
Hiroshi Miyama no Enka no Yoake	RKC

== Bibliography ==
Year	Title	Ref.
2016	Hajimete demo Zettai dekiru! Hiroshi Miyama no Kendama Kyōshitsu	
