= Tamori =

Japanese comedian

- タモリ
- Born: Kazuyoshi Morita (森田 一義); 22 August 1945 (age 81); Minami-ku, Fukuoka, Japan
- Employer: Tanabe Agency
- Notable work: Waratte Iitomo!; Music Station; Tamori Club

Comedy career
- Years active: 1975–present
- Medium: Television
- Genre: Owarai

Kazuyoshi Morita (森田 一義, Morita Kazuyoshi; born 22 August 1945 in Fukuoka City, Fukuoka Prefecture), known by his stage name Tamori (タモリ) (an anagram of his surname), is a Japanese comedian and television presenter. Known for his trademark dark sunglasses, Tamori is one of the "big three" television comedians in Japan along with Takeshi Kitano (a.k.a. Beat Takeshi) and Sanma Akashiya.

Since taking over the role in April 1987, Tamori has hosted the weekly music television program Music Station for over 34 years. For 32 years he hosted Waratte Iitomo!, a nationally televised live show broadcast every weekday at noon from October 1982 until March 2014. Waratte Iitomo! earned Tamori the Guinness World Record for "Longest continued hosting of a live television program", while Music Station earned him the world record for "Longest running live TV music show hosted by the same presenter" in 2021. His likeness is the basis for the Piranha Plant in All Night Nippon Super Mario Bros..

== Programs on which Tamori appears ==
=== Current ===
- Music Station (TV Asahi) (April 1987–present)
- Bura Tamori (Strolling with Tamori) (NHK General TV) (December 2008, October 2009–March, 2010, October 2010–March 2011, April 2014–present)
- Tales of the Unusual（TV series） (Fuji TV) (April–September 1990, January–December 1991, April–September 1992, and Spring & Autumn special editions every year since 1994 except spring 2006)
- FNS no hi (Fuji TV) (every July, 1992–present)

=== Past ===
- Ethica no Kagami (Fuji TV) (October 2008–September 2010)
- Tamori's Japonica Logos (Fuji TV) (October 2005 – September 2008)
- Special Drama: Murder case of Akiko Wada (TBS) (February 2007)
- Hey! Spring of Trivia (Fuji TV) (July 2003 – September 2006)
- Tamori, Takeshi, Sanma, Big 3 Golf Match (Fuji TV) (New year program on 1988, 1989, 1991–1994, 1996–1999)
- Tamori's Vocabula Tengoku (Fuji TV) (October 1992 – March 1997)
- Tamori no Picross (St.GIGA Satellaview) (August 1995 – March 1996)
- Tamori's Music is the World (TV Tokyo) (September 1994 – March 1996)
- Tamori's Gap don (TV Tokyo) (September–Decemober 1994)
- Drama: If Moshimo (Fuji TV) (April–September 1993)
- Special Drama : Self dropout (TBS) (April 1990)
- Kon'ya wa Saikō ~WHAT A FANTASTIC NIGHT!~) (NTV) (April 1981 – October 1989)
- Amazing Small Universe: Human body (NHK General) (June & September 1989)
- Watching (NHK General) (April 1985 – March 1989)
- Waratte Iitomo! (Fuji TV) (October 1982–March 2014)
- Owarai Star Tanjō!! (NTV) (April 1980 – September 1986)
- 24-Hour Television (NTV) (every August, 1978–1984)
- Kōhaku Uta Gassen (NHK General) (as a guest in 1979, 1980, 2014, as MC in 1983)
- Yūkan Tamori Kochira desu (TV Asahi) (October 1981 – March 1982) (preceding program of Tamori Club)
- Variety Televifasorasido (NHK General) (April 1980 – March 1982)
- Star Tanjō!! (NTV) (April 1980 – April 1981)
- Notte sea venture (TV Asahi) (April – June 1980)
- Drama Ningen Moyō: Swindler (NHK General) (April 1980)
- Friday 10!Uwasa no Channel!! (NTV) (October 1973 – June 1979)
- Sunday Owarai namachūkei (MBS/TBS) (August 1978 – March 1979)
- Channel Thief! Pleasurable Gag Program! Monty Python's Flying Circus (gag program part following dubbed Monty Python's original program) (TV Tokyo) (April–September 1976)
- Tetsuko's room (TV Asahi, as the last guest of each year 1978–2013)
- Yoru Tamori (Fuji TV) (October 2014 – 2015)
- Tamori Club (TV Asahi) (October 1982–April 2023)

== See also ==
- Tamori Club
- Soramimi, a term for a type of comedy pioneered by the "Soramimi Hour" segment of Tamori Club
