= NHK News Ohayō Nippon =

Japanese morning television show

- Genre: News
- Presented by: Weekdays; Masatomo Takai; Kana Nakayama; Kyosuke Katsuro; Daiki Takeno; So Sakamoto; Sakura Araki; Kaho Iwasaki; Mana Sato; Weekend; Jiro Inoue; Nonoka Akaki
- Country of origin: Japan
- Original language: Japanese

Production
- Production locations: NHK Broadcasting Center; Shibuya, Tokyo, Japan
- Camera setup: Multi-camera
- Running time: 210 minutes (Weekdays); 120 minutes (Saturdays); 45 minutes (Sundays); 60 minutes (Holidays)

Original release
- Network: NHK-G
- Release: April 10, 1993 – present

NHK News Ohayō Nippon (Japanese: NHKニュース おはよう日本, English: News: Good Morning, Japan) is a Japanese morning television show on NHK General TV, anchored mainly by Masatomo Takai and Kana Nakayama, from the NHK studios at NHK Broadcasting Center in Tokyo, Japan. It debuted in April 1993 replacing NHK Morning Wide. The weekend editions are anchored by Jiro Inoue and Nonoka Akaki.

This program airs weekdays from 5:00–8:00 a.m. JST. The weekend editions air from 6:00–8:00 a.m. JST (Saturdays), 7:00–7:45 a.m. JST (Sundays), or 7:00–8:00 a.m. JST (National Holidays). It is simulcast on NHK World Premium to countries other than Japan (except weekday edition, from 4:30–6:00 a.m. JST).

== Format ==
The weekday edition of the program is divided into two parts. The first part airs from 4:30–6:00 a.m. JST only domestically on NHK General TV. It features live news, weather forecasts, special-interest stories and market information. The second part airs from 6:00–7:45 a.m. JST both domestically and internationally, featuring news, sports, interviews, and segments such as "Koko ni Chumoku (Focus on This!)" (featuring in-depth political or economical topics by NHK's specialist on the field.), "Machikado Jōhōshitsu (Street Information Room)" (featuring inventions that help make people's daily life more convenient), "Sekai no Media Zapping" (featuring selected viral video or television program clips from news bulletins all over the world), "Check! Entamé" (featuring pop culture and entertainment news, and viral videos), and "Ohayō Vitamin" (featuring a mix of entertainment, lifestyle and human-interest stories).

The Saturday edition begins at 6:00 a.m. JST, featuring live news, sports, weather forecasts, market information, and some short stories until 8:00 a.m. JST. The Sunday edition, airing from 7:00–8:00 a.m. JST, features news, sports and weather forecasts.

== Notable personalities ==
=== Main presenters ===
- Masatomo Takai - weekdays (2025 – present)
- Kana Nakayama - weekdays (2020 – 2021, 2025 – present)
- Kyosuke Katsuro - weekdays, triweekly (2024 – present)
- Daiki Takeno - weekdays, triweekly (2026 – present)
- So Sakamoto - weekdays, triweekly (2026 – present)
- Sakura Araki - weekdays, triweekly (2026 – present)
- Kaho Iwasaki - weekdays, triweekly (2026 – present)
- Mana Sato - weekdays, triweekly (2026 – present)
- Jiro Inoue - weekend (2022 – present)
- Nonoka Akaki - weekend (2024 – present)

=== Sports ===
- Nahoko Hori - weekdays, biweekly (2021 – present)
- Takaaki Shimizu - weekend (2024 – present)

=== Weather information ===
- Yasuhiro Hiyama - weekdays (2018 – present)
- Ayane Hareyama - weekdays (2026 – present)
- Toshiyuki Minami - weekend (2007 – present)

=== Correspondents ===
- Shinya Kuroda
- Hiroki Yamada
- Tomohiko Katayama
- Keiichi Tokunaga
- Hikaru Urushibara

== Former personalities ==
=== Weekdays ===
- Isamu Akashi (1993 – 1994)
- Yoshinari Imai (1993 – 1995)
- Maoko Kotani (1993 – 1994)
- Mitsuyo Kusano (1993 – 1994)
- Nobuo Murakami (1994 – 1995)
- Yumiko Udo (1994 – 1997, 2009 – 2010)
- Hirohide Ito (1995 – 2000)
- Norio Ishizawa (1995 – 1997)
- Yukiko Ito (1996 – 1997)
- Masaiku Nomura (1997 – 2000, 2004 – 2006)
- Tamio Miyake (1997 – 2004)
- Aiko Doden (1997 – 1999)
- Toko Takeuchi (1997 – 2002)
- Mariko Takai (1999 – 2001)
- Koichi Sumida (2000 – 2003)
- Seiko Nakajo (2001 – 2005)
- Misuzu Takahashi (2002 – 2006)
- Kaku Kakinuma (2003 – 2005)
- Junichi Tosaka (2004 – 2005)
- Yutaka Hoshino (2004 – 2005)
- Takehiko Ito (2005 – 2006)
- Toshiyuki Terazawa (2005 – 2006)
- Tsuyoshi Matsuo (2005 – 2008)
- Yuriko Shimazu (2005, 2008 – 2012)
- Mihoko Kitago (2006)
- Tadashi Goto (2006 – 2007)
- Taisuke Yokoo (2006 – 2007)
- Takashi Mashimo (2006 – 2007)
- Tomoko Kogo (2006 – 2008, 2016 – 2019)
- Nachiko Shudo weekdays (2006 – 2010, 2022 – 2025)
- Tetsuya Kaneko (2007 – 2008)
- Akira Kamioka (2007 – 2008)
- Takeshige Morimoto (2007 – 2012)
- Kozo Takase (2008 – 2010, 2017 – 2022)
- Ryubun Sato (2008 – 2009)
- Wataru Abe (2008 – 2017)
- Yuko Isono (2008 – 2009)
- Nami Morimoto (2009 – 2010)
- Tomoki Muto (2010 – 2011)
- Shie Ezaki (2010 – 2014)
- Naoko Suzuki (2010 – 2015)
- Takeshi Takigawa (2011 – 2014)
- Kei Koyama (2011 – 2012, 2013 – 2016)
- Tomohiko Katayama (2011 – 2012)
- Yasuhiko Eto (2012 – 2013)
- Yoji Itoi (2012 – 2015)
- Noriko Kamijo (2012 – 2014)
- Masaaki Arita (2013 – 2014)
- Naoki Ninomiya (2014 – 2015)
- Yosuke Nakayama (2014 – 2015)
- Aiko Terakado (2014 – 2015)
- Masanobu Horikoshi (2015 – 2016)
- Ryuichi Yoshikawa (2015 – 2017)
- Akiko Gobaru (2015 – 2016)
- Mayuko Wakuda (2015 – 2020)
- Takuya Tadokoro (2016 – 2018)
- Keiko Nakamura (2016 – 2017)
- Yurie Omi (2016 – 2018)
- Nonoka Akaki (2017 – 2018)
- Yohei Morita (2017 – 2018)
- Seita Sato (2017 – 2019)
- Masayuki Sanjo (2017 – 2019, 2022 – 2025)
- Mitsuki Uehara (2017 – 2018)
- Katsuki Sato (2018 – 2021)
- Yoshiki Iwano (2018 – 2019)
- Risa Hayashida (2018 – 2020)
- Sayuri Hori (2018 – 2020)
- Shinji Shioda (2019 – 2022)
- Shinya Tonegawa (2019 – 2022)
- Erika Morishita (2020 – 2022)
- Maho Kuwako (2020 – 2022)
- Takanobu Hayasaka (2020 – 2022)
- Keiichiro Ebara (2021 – 2022)
- Izumi Yamauchi (2021 – 2022)
- Shunkichi Sato (2021 – 2023)
- Nao Kondo (2021 – 2026)
- Ayumi Sato (2022 – 2024)
- Marie Morita (2022 – 2024)
- Tomohiro Hatta (2022 – 2024)
- Shun Kaneko (2023 – 2024)
- Fumiaki Ono (2023 – 2025)
- Aoi Noguchi (2024 – 2025)
- Hiroki Uchikoshi (2024 – 2025)
- Maika Otani (2024 – 2026)
- Yuta Hirose (2025 – 2026)
- Tomoyuki Yazaki (2025 – 2026)
- Miki Toyoshima (2025 – 2026)

=== Weekends ===
- Satoshi Hatakeyama (1993 – 1994)
- Ayumi Kuroda (1993 – 1995)
- Yutaka Hoshino (1994 – 1995)
- Nobuo Murakami (1995 – 1997)
- Keiko Hirano (1995 – 1997)
- Hirohide Ito (1997 – 1999)
- Kaoru Ishii (1997 – 1998)
- Mariko Takai (1998 – 1999)
- Atsuko Sueda (1999 – 2000)
- Masaiku Nomura (1999 – 2000)
- Masao Sueda (2000 – 2004)
- Takako Zenba (2000 – 2004)
- Tsuyoshi Matsuo (2004 – 2005)
- Yuriko Shimazu (2004 – 2005)
- Yutaka Hoshino (2005 – 2007)
- Masako Takishima (2005 – 2007)
- Takashi Mashimo (2007 – 2008)
- Yuko Isono (2007 – 2008)
- Takeshige Morimoto (2008 – 2012)
- Nachiko Shudo (2008 – 2010)
- Nami Morimoto (2010 – 2011)
- Sawako Watanabe (2011 – 2012)
- Shie Ezaki (2012 – 2014)
- Kei Koyama (2012 – 2013)
- Yuichi Chikada (2013 – 2017)
- Mayuko Wakuda (2014 – 2015)
- Noriko Kamijo (2015 – 2016)
- Hidekazu Arai (2016 – 2022)
- Tomoko Kogo (2016 – 2019)
- Naoki Ninomiya (2017 – 2018)
- Minori Chiba (2017 – 2018)
- Tomomi Hirose (2019 – 2022)
- Asa Ishibashi (2019 – 2021)
- Rika Kawasaki (2021 – 2022)
- Erika Morishita (2022 – 2023)
- Aiko Terakado (2023 – 2024)
