= Nonoka Akaki =

Japanese announcer

- 赤木 野々花
- Born: August 8, 1990 (age 35); Okayama, Japan
- Education: Keio University
- Occupations: television host; television presenter; announcer
- Years active: 2013–present
- Employer: NHK
- Television: NHK News Ohayō Nippon weekend newscaster (2024–present); Saturday Watch 9 host (2022–2024); Utacon host (2020–2025); Nipponjin no Onamae host (2017–2022); Oyasumi Nippon Nemuiine host (2018–2020); NHK News Ohayō Nippon biweekly newscaster (2017–2018)
- Title: NHK Announcer
- Term: 2013–present

Nonoka Akaki (赤木 野々花, Akaki Nonoka; born August 8, 1990) is a Japanese female announcer and newscaster for NHK.

== Early years ==
Born and raised in Okayama, Japan, Akaki graduated from Keio University. During college, she won the Runner Up title in the Yukata Beauty Contest, Tokyo's local beauty pageant.

== Career ==
After graduating from Keio University in 2013, Akaki was hired by NHK and started her career at NHK Tokushima Branch, where she worked until March 2015. In April 2015, she was relocated to NHK Osaka Branch, where she hosted News Hot Kansai.

In March 2017, Akaki was moved to Tokyo Announcement Room and appointed as a biweekly newscaster of NHK's morning news show NHK News Ohayō Nippon as well as Yurie Omi. At the same time, she co-hosts an information program Naming Variety Nipponjin no Onamae! (currently Nipponjin no Onamae) with Ichiro Furutachi.

On February 21, 2018, NHK has announced that Akaki is leaving NHK News Ohayō Nippon and being an anchor for Shinsedai ga Toku! Nippon no Dilemma from April 2018.

On February 9, 2022, NHK announced that Akaki was supposed to be the host of the newly-founded weekend night news show Saturday Watch 9 in April.

On February 14, 2024, Akaki returned to NHK's morning news show NHK News Ohayō Nippon as weekend newscaster starting April.

== Personal life ==
Akaki has been a good harpist since junior high school. She joined Okayama Junior Orchestra and sometimes played in public.

== See also ==
- Ichiro Furutachi

Media offices
Preceded by Tomoko Kogo	Utacon Host; 2020–2025	Succeeded by Asa Ishibashi
First	Saturday Watch 9 Anchor; 2022–2024	Succeeded by Ryoji Ito; Risa Hayashida
