= NHK World Premium =

International broadcasting service by NHK

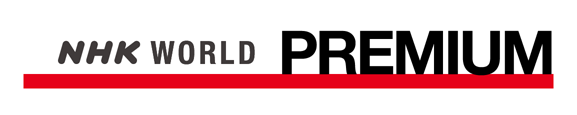
- Country: Japan
- Broadcast area: Asia Pacific, EMEA, CIS, Latin America
- Headquarters: NHK Broadcasting Center, Shibuya, Tokyo, Japan

Programming
- Languages: Japanese (Main audio); English (available on bilingual programs)
- Picture format: 16:9 480i/576i (SDTV); 16:9 1080i (HDTV)

Ownership
- Owner: NHK World-Japan
- Sister channels: NHK World TV; NHK General TV; NHK Educational TV; NHK BS; NHK BS Premium 4K; NHK BS8K

History
- Launched: 1 April 1998

Links
- Website: www.nhkworldpremium.com

NHK World Premium is a TV news and entertainment broadcasting service offered by NHK World-Japan, the international arm of Japan's public broadcaster NHK. The service is aimed towards Japanese Diaspora and the overseas market, similar to worldwide national channels such as CCTV-4, KBS World, TV5Monde, TVE Internacional, RTP Internacional, TV Chile, Rai Italia or RTR-Planeta, and broadcast through subscription TV providers around the world.

The purpose of NHK World Premium is to make original, general television content produced by NHK available to an international audience. It provides a mixture of news, sports and entertainment shows in Japanese language, all of which are simulcast or previously shown on NHK's domestic TV networks in Japan (NHK G, NHK E, NHK BS, NHK BS Premium 4K, and NHK BS8K).

The service is marketed as premium pay cable/satellite TV channel with that very name across Asia Pacific, Africa (except Arabic-speaking North Africa) & Latin America. The service is broadcast in Europe, the Middle East and North Africa via the streaming provider toober and some pay TV operators following JSTV ceased transmission on October 31, 2023. It was also broadcast in North America via their streaming platform Jme after TV Japan went offline on March 31, 2024.

Contents generally do not carry English subtitles or dubbing, while a few of them, especially news, have bilingual audio (kept from their original, domestic broadcast in Japan, where it also offered for the newscast).

== Content restrictions ==
Some content, especially footage of sporting events, is blocked from the channel due to copyright restrictions, as NHK only holds the rights within Japan. The footage is replaced by either a still graphic from the channel or, in the case of sporting events, still photographs, though in early years it was limited to a black screen with the blocking message superimposed.

== Censorship ==
Aside from the content restrictions put above, some government have blocked NHK World's broadcasts for temporary periods due to content not suitable to the government of the host country where the channel is received.

This mostly happens in China; in the past it was a blank screen, but since at least 2020, cable companies relaying the channel there replaced it with their technical difficulties screen.

== Programmes ==
- Food (carry Fod listed as BBC Japan)
- AKB48 Show!
- Everyday Tips
- Fudoki
- Fun with English
- Go Focus
- Good Morning, Japan
- International News Report
- The JFA Emperor's Cup Show!
- Mini Program
- Morning Market
- News (carry news from NHK General TV)
- News & Weather (from NHK General TV)
- News Watch 9
- NHK News (carry news from NHK BS 1 which usually airs at 50 minutes past the hour)
- NHK News 7
- NHK Premap (program highlights)
- Nippon Professional Baseball
- Kōhaku Uta Gassen
- Science for Everyone
- Shounen Club
- Sports Plus
- Utacon
- With Mother
- World Weather

== See also ==
- NHK World
- NHK World TV
