= TV Japan =

Defunct Japanese-language North American television channel

- Country: United States
- Broadcast area: Northern America
- Headquarters: New York City

Programming
- Languages: Japanese; English (via SAP; selected programs)
- Picture format: 480i SDTV (widescreen); 1080i HDTV

Ownership
- Owner: NHK Cosmomedia America Inc.

History
- Launched: April 1, 1991
- Closed: March 31, 2024
- Replaced by: Jme

TV Japan (テレビジャパン) was a 24-hour Japanese-language television channel geared towards the Japanese diaspora in the United States and Canada. It was the North American carrier of the NHK World Premium service. The channel was owned by NHK CosmoMedia America Inc., a subsidiary of NHK Enterprises, the commercial arm of the Japan Broadcasting Corporation (NHK), Japan's national public broadcaster, and was available on many cable providers in the United States and Canada, and through U.S. satellite provider DirecTV.

While there are a handful of local and regional channels in the United States with primarily Japanese programming, TV Japan was, for much of its history, the only such channel available nationwide in both the U.S. and Canada. (A modified version of Nippon Television launched through DirecTV in 2019, and on Telus Optik TV in western Canada in 2020.)

The TV Japan linear channel ceased broadcasting on March 31, 2024. After the closing date, NHK Cosmomedia continued to serve the North American market through its Jme streaming platform, however that service is scheduled to close in March 2027.

== History ==
TV Japan launched on cable systems in 1991, broadcasting for five to six hours a day. Since its beginning, it also had nationwide distribution on the Primestar satellite service. On March 12, 1996, it was removed from Cablevision's Long Island system due to its low number of subscribers. On Primestar, it moved to a higher slot (401/402) in 1997, as part of the provider's new line-up. It received CRTC approval in July 1997.

The channel was added to Dish Network on May 1, 1998, increasing the provider's offer of international channels. At the time, the channel was carried in 100,000 hotel rooms, using Primestar to deliver its signals. Not all hotels cleared out a full day's line-up (23 hours) due to limitations with certain cable networks. In January 1999, the channel's roll-out in Canada began following its CRTC approval, being launched on Shaw's digital service. By March 2000, it was added to Rogers. In early 2000, its English audio track was temporarily switched off, causing complaints from Shaw subscribers during sumo tournaments over the loss of English commentary.

On March 15, 2000, TV Japan moved to a new facility in Manhattan's Broadway, with digital equipment. This enabled TV Japan to carry quicker connections to the NHK satellite feed in case breaking news coverage happened. In June, it signed a distribution agreement with International Channel Networks to include the channel in its package of foreign networks for US cable companies.

== Programming ==
TV Japan aired various programs from Japan including news coverage from NHK, dramas, movies, children's programs, and entertainment shows. Programming was provided mainly by NHK, but some entertainment programs originated from commercial Japanese broadcasters including TBS, Nippon TV, TV Tokyo, Fuji Television and TV Asahi. Some programming was subtitled or dubbed into English, while NHK's main news programs were available with English translation on SAP, with the original Japanese presentation on the main audio channel. TV Japan also featured extensive sports coverage including coverage of the Grand Sumo tournaments (with English commentary on SAP), Nippon Professional Baseball games and J-League soccer matches.

TV Japan did no news production. As of 2000, its facilities had a fiber-optic link to NHK's General Bureau for the Americas in New York.

== Free previews ==
TV Japan typically provided a free preview through most carrying service providers for approximately two weeks in April each year.

In response to the massive earthquake and tsunami that hit the Northern area of Japan on the afternoon of March 11, 2011, cable and satellite TV providers across the United States and Canada provided a free-to-air broadcast giving viewers who may have friends and family in Japan with the latest news and information via a live simulcast from parent NHK. The channel offered a one-week free preview between November 14 and November 21 to support earthquake relief funds.

== Closure ==
In early 2024, cable and satellite service providers began to inform customers that the channel would be discontinued on March 31. The network's website confirmed the closure on February 17, with programming to transfer to Dlibrary Japan, a service which would rebrand as Jme on March 20. Jme then added live feeds of NHK World Premium and NHK World-Japan, NHK's English-language news channel. Jme Select, a linear streaming channel with programs scheduled at appropriate times for North American audiences similar to the outgoing TV Japan channel, launched as part of the service on April 1.

The service is intended to be more flexible for viewers than the former channel, which was often offered alone as a premium offering, usually priced at about $20-25 a month in local currency depending on the provider (on top of any base service fees for that provider), without any alternate out-of-home streaming or on-demand options. At launch, Jme was priced at US$25 per month, or about C$34 at then-current exchange rates.

On October 1, 2026, a notice was added to the Jme website indicating it would cease operations on March 31, 2027, citing a declining number of subscribers and changes in the media environment. NHK began to distribute NHK World Premium through third-party streaming platforms Sling TV in the U.S. and Toober in Canada in advance of the shutdown.
