= Haguregumo =

Japanese manga series by George Akiyama

- First edition of Haguregumo, published by Shogakukan on July 6, 1975

浮浪雲 (Haguregumo)
- Manga
- Written by: George Akiyama
- Published by: Shogakukan
- Magazine: Big Comic Original
- Original run: 1973 – 2017
- Volumes: 112
- Television drama
- Written by: Sō Kuramoto; Narito Kaneko
- Music by: Katsuo Ohno
- Studio: TV Asahi; Ishihara International Productions
- Original network: ANN (TV Asahi)
- Original run: April 2 – September 10, 1978
- Episodes: 20
- Anime film
- Directed by: Mori Masaki
- Produced by: Chiaki Imada
- Written by: Atsushi Yamatoya
- Music by: Seiji Yokoyama
- Studio: Toei Animation (Note: Production assistance (製作協力) was provided by Madhouse.)
- Released: 24 April 1982
- Runtime: 91 minutes
- Television drama
- Written by: Ichiro Miyagawa; Masahiro Yoshimoto
- Music by: Bob Sakuma
- Studio: TBS
- Original network: JNN (TBS)
- Original run: October 11, 1990 – March 28, 1991
- Episodes: 22
- Television drama
- Written by: Ryô Takada; Masashi Shimizu
- Music by: Kôji Endô
- Original network: NHK BS, NHK BS Premium 4K
- Original run: 2026 – scheduled
- Episodes: 8

Haguregumo (浮浪雲; literally "Vagrant Cloud") is a Japanese manga series written and illustrated by George Akiyama. It was serialized by Shogakukan in Big Comic Original from 1973 to 2017 and collected in 112 tankōbon volumes. Haguregumo received the 1979 Shogakukan Manga Award for the general category.

It was adapted into a television drama that aired on TV Asahi and its affiliates in 1978, an anime film produced by Toei Animation in 1982 and another drama adaptation that aired on TBS and its affiliates from 1990 to 1991 while a new adaptation produced by NHK is scheduled to air on NHK BS and NHK BS Premium 4K in 2026.

== Plot ==
Set at the end of the Edo period, the series depicts Cloud's family with his wife, Turtle, their 11-year-old son, and 8-year-old daughter. The Clouds are always ignoring their work and playing. Cloud is notorious for womanising.

== Characters ==
- Cloud (雲, Kumo) is the protagonist of the series. He is a famous womaniser and rarely works.
- Turtle (かめ, Kame) is married to Cloud and often joins her husband in his idling.
- Shinnosuke (新之助) is the 11-year-old son of Cloud and Turtle. His personality is completely opposite of his father's.
- Flower (お花, Ohana) is the 8-year-old daughter of Cloud and Turtle. She is a tomboy and has a serious attitude, opposite to those of her parents.

== Manga ==
=== Volume list ===
No.	Release date	ISBN
1	June 6, 1975	4-09-180051-3
001. (宿場女郎); 002. (戸塚ッ原の対決); 003. (木曽路から来た男); 004. (品川慕情); 005. (街道工事不正事件); 006. (くりからもんもん); 007. (幽霊駕篭); 008. (黒の舟唄); 009. (風流トンヤレ節)
2	July 9, 1975	4-09-180052-1
3	August 7, 1975	4-09-180053-X
4	January 28, 1976	4-09-180054-8
5	February 27, 1976	4-09-180055-6
6	September 1, 1976	4-09-180056-4
7	December 23, 1976	4-09-180057-2
8	March 31, 1977	4-09-180058-0
9	January 31, 1978	4-09-180059-9
10	June 29, 1978	4-09-180060-2
11	December 21, 1978	4-09-180181-1
12	August 1, 1979	4-09-180182-X
13	September 1979	978-4-09-180183-8
14	March 29, 1980	4-09-180184-6
15	April 25, 1980	4-09-180185-4
16	October 29, 1980	4-09-180186-2
17	March 28, 1981	4-09-180187-0
18	December 1, 1981	4-09-180188-9
19	January 28, 1982	4-09-180189-7
20	February 26, 1982	4-09-180190-0
21	September 28, 1982	4-09-180521-3
22	October 28, 1982	4-09-180522-1
23	September 30, 1983	4-09-180523-X
24	October 29, 1983	4-09-180524-8
25	November 30, 1983	4-09-180525-6
26	August 30, 1984	4-09-180526-4
27	September 29, 1984	4-09-180527-2
28	February 28, 1985	4-09-180528-0
29	June 29, 1985	4-09-180529-9
30	January 30, 1986	4-09-180530-2
31	June 30, 1986	4-09-181121-3
32	September 30, 1986	9784091811226
33	November 29, 1986	409181123X
34	March 30, 1987	4-09-181124-8
35	April 30, 1987	4-09-181125-6
36	July 30, 1987	4-09-181126-4
37	December 17, 1987	4-09-181127-2
38	June 30, 1988	4-09-181128-0
39	February 28, 1989	4-09-181129-9
40	June 30, 1989	4-09-181130-2
41	September 30, 1989	4-09-182101-4
42	January 30, 1990	4-09-182102-2
43	May 30, 1990	4-09-182103-0
44	September 29, 1990	4-09-182104-9
45	December 19, 1990	4-09-182105-7
46	June 29, 1991	4-09-182106-5
47	February 29, 1992	4-09-182107-3
48	August 29, 1992	4-09-182108-1
49	February 27, 1993	4-09-182109-X
50	July 30, 1993	4-09-182110-3
51	January 29, 1994	4-09-183341-1
52	June 30, 1994	4-09-183342-X
53	March 30, 1995	4-09-183343-8
54	October 30, 1995	4-09-183344-6
55	May 30, 1996	4-09-183345-4
56	October 30, 1996	4-09-183346-2
57	May 30, 1997	4-09-183347-0
58	August 30, 1997	4-09-183348-9
59	November 29, 1997	4-09-183349-7
60	April 30, 1998	4-09-183350-0
61	September 30, 1998	4-09-185151-7
62	February 26, 1999	4-09-185152-5
63	April 27, 1999	4-09-185153-3
64	October 29, 1999	4-09-185154-1
65	April 26, 2000	4-09-185155-X
66	August 30, 2000	4-09-185156-8
67	December 25, 2000	4-09-185157-6
68	January 30, 2001	4-09-185158-4
69	May 30, 2001	4-09-185159-2
70	October 30, 2001	4-09-185160-6
71	February 28, 2002	4-09-186471-6
72	June 29, 2002	4-09-186472-4
73	January 30, 2003	4-09-186473-2
74	March 29, 2003	4-09-186474-0
75	October 30, 2003	4-09-186475-9
76	March 30, 2004	4-09-186476-7
77	August 30, 2004	4-09-186477-5
78	December 24, 2004	4-09-186478-3
79	May 30, 2005	4-09-186479-1
80	August 30, 2005	4-09-186480-5
81	March 30, 2006	4-09-180236-2
82	August 30, 2006	4-09-180704-6
83	December 26, 2006	4-09-181005-5
84	May 30, 2007	978-4-09-181237-7
85	October 30, 2007	978-4-09-181520-0
86	April 26, 2008	978-4-09-181879-9
87	September 30, 2008	978-4-09-182158-4
88	January 30, 2009	978-4-09-182356-4
89	May 29, 2009	978-4-09-182496-7
90	November 30, 2009	978-4-09-182777-7
91	April 28, 2010	978-4-09-183154-5
92	October 29, 2010	978-4-09-183514-7
93	May 30, 2011	978-4-09-183838-4
94	November 30, 2011	978-4-09-184185-8
95	April 27, 2012	978-4-09-184450-7
96	October 30, 2012	978-4-09-184763-8
97	January 30, 2013	978-4-09-184870-3
98	March 29, 2013	978-4-09-185050-8
99	June 28, 2013	978-4-09-185270-0
100	September 30, 2013	978-4-09-185428-5
101	November 29, 2013	978-4-09-185679-1
102	March 28, 2014	978-4-09-186053-8
103	June 30, 2014	978-4-09-186240-2
104	November 28, 2014	978-4-09-186379-9
105	March 30, 2015	978-4-09-186822-0
106	November 30, 2015	978-4-09-187347-7
107	April 28, 2016	978-4-09-187604-1
108	September 30, 2016	978-4-09-187795-6
109	February 28, 2017	978-4-09-189385-7
110	May 30, 2017	978-4-09-189518-9
111	September 29, 2017	978-4-09-189654-4
112	January 30, 2018	978-4-09-189790-9

== Television series 1978 ==
- Tetsuya Watari as Kumo
- Kaori Momoi as Kame Onna
- Toshio Shiba as Aota
- Rinichi Yamamoto as Shunjyu Oyabun
- Hideji Otaki as Chojyuro Suzuki
- Chishū Ryū as Shibusawa
- Yujiro Ishihara as Iwakichi
- Written by Sō Kuramoto.

== Reception ==
By January 2016, the series had over 7.5 million copies sold.
