= Shaula Vogue =

American fashion model, DJ and presenter (born 1986)

- シャウラ・ヴォーグ
- Born: August 28, 1986 (age 40); Honolulu, Hawaii, United States
- Other names: Shaula Shaula, Shaula
- Occupations: Presenter; announcer; DJ; fashion model
- Presenting career
- Show: Recorrer
- Stations: InterFM; JFN
- Time slot: Mon. and Tue. 13:30–16:55
- Show: Biz Stream
- Network: NHK World-Japan
- Time slot: Sat. 23:10-23:40
- Country: Japan
- Previous shows: Power of Music, Ready Steady George, Sky Gate Travelling Groove, FLY! DAY TRIPPER～FROM SKY GATE～TRIP1, Chikyū TV El Mundo, Aloha Girl
- Website: Official website

Shaula Vogue (born 28 August 1986) is a Japanese-American radio and television presenter, DJ and fashion model raised in Honolulu and, as of 2023, living in Japan. She hosts Recorrer on InterFM plus 25 JFN stations nationwide and cohosts Design Talks Plus (NHK E and NHK World-Japan) and Biz Stream (NHK World-Japan), as well as her own podcast Greenhouse Radio with Shaula.

Vogue debuted in 2007 in TV Tokyo's late night programme Aloha Girl. Soon she started appearing in fashion magazines such as ViVi and Glitter and participating in events as Kobe Collection and Tokyo Girls Collection. Vogue had her radio debut in 2008 on Chiba's Bay FM.

Since late 2021 she is represented by Cent. Force through its ZONE section. She used to be represented by Ryo Izuno's agency Office R.

== Media appearances ==
=== Current ===
==== Radio ====
- Recorrer, InterFM (Tokyo) and other 25 JFN stations nationwide (Mon. to Thu.; Vogue hosts on Mondays and Tuesdays) (2023)

==== Television ====
- Biz Stream, NHK World-Japan (Sat.)
- Design Talks Plus, NHK-E Tele (Thu.) / NHK World Japan (Wed.)
- Love Music, Fuji TV (Sun.)

==== Podcast ====
- Greenhouse Radio with Shaula (since May 2021)
- Bucket List -Driven by Dreams- powered by Porsche Japan (since December 2021)

=== Past ===
==== Radio ====
- Power of Music~Imakoso Kikitai Ongaku~, InterFM, Tokyo (Mon. to Fri.) (April to December 2022)
- Blue Ocean, Tokyo FM, Tokyo (one-off appearance, 17 August 2021)
- Tokyo Morning Radio, J-WAVE, Tokyo (filling for main announcer Tetsuya Bessho, 1–4 March 2021)
- Omotesandō-Ao 10th Anniversary Presents Oshare Life, InterFM, Tokyo (Sat.) (2017–2018; 2018–2019; 2019–2020, 2020–2021)
- Sonic Radio, InterFM, Tokyo (Mon.) (until 2020)
- Ready Steady George, with George Williams, InterFM, Tokyo (Mon.-Thu., live; simulcast between July 2019 and March 2020 on Radio NEO, Nagoya) (2014–2020)
- Sky Gate Travelling Groove, Bay FM, Chiba (Fri., broadcast live from Narita International Airport) (2011–2019)
- FLY! DAY TRIPPER～FROM SKY GATE～TRIP1, Bay FM, Chiba (Fri. live from Narita Airport) (2008–2010)
- Good Times Boo!, InterFM, Tokyo, December 2013

==== Television ====
- DRESS tv. (May 2013 – March 2014, MBS）
- TOKYO BRANDNEW DAYS〜Ashita no Watashi〜 (November 2013, BS Japan)
- Tokyo Jōkyū Date (Tokyo Precious Dating), 25 September 2013, TV Asahi (episode 71, Takadanobaba)
- Chikyū TV El Mundo, April 2011 – March 2012, NHK BS1 (presenter on Tuesdays)
- 3D★3D "Miryoku Saihakken! 3D de Toru Hawaii", October 2011, BS Fuji
- Sasuke Rising and Sasuke Rising Chokuzen Nabi, TBS
- Sekai Baribari Value (MBS)
- Aloha girl（April – September 2007, TV Tokyo）

== Personal life ==
Born to an American father and a Japanese mother, Vogue grew up in Manoa, Honolulu, where she attended St. Francis High School. She had previously spent time in Ashibetsu, Hokkaido with her mother.

Vogue lives in Tokyo. She announced in 2017 in her blog she had married.
