= NHK Newsline =

- Logo used until September 5, 2026
- Presented by: Various anchors
- Country of origin: Japan
- Original language: English

Production
- Production locations: NHK Broadcasting Center, Shibuya, Tokyo, Japan
- Running time: 30 minutes (weekdays); 10 minutes (weekends and holidays); 15–120 minutes or more (during live coverages, Japanese elections or Breaking News)

Original release
- Network: NHK World TV
- Release: 3 April 2000 – present

Related
- NHK Newswatch; News Today 30 Minutes

NHK Newsline (stylized as NHK NEWSLiNE, formerly and also simply known as Newsline) (Japanese: NHKニュースライン NHK Nyūsurain) is a foreign news program aired on NHK's international broadcasting service NHK World TV. Produced by Japan International Broadcasting Inc., the program broadcasts on the hour, 24 hours a day.

== History ==
NHK Newsline started as Day Line Japan in April 1997, with a length of 10 minutes, and airing several times a day. In 2000, the program's name was changed to Newsline. The English spoken portions of the program would gradually expand with time.

On January 30, 2009, News Watch 9 - an English-dubbed news program - was removed from the NHK World line-up. On February 2, 2009, Newsline was re-formatted in order to fill the gap left by News Watch 9, by changing to a news and information program. Newsline's time slot also changed to air at the top of every hour, 24 times a day. The length of the program was typically 30 minutes during the week, and 10 minutes on weekends and Japanese holidays. The program has been referred to as NHK Newsline since Late March 2016.

On April 1, 2019, NHK Newsline changed to a 15-20 minute format on weekdays at most times, while other Newsline-branded programs fill the remaining time until the bottom of the hour. These include Newsline Biz, which features a latest business, financial, and economic news, with added analysis from studio guests, and Newsline In Depth, with a colorful variety of feature stories. Newsline is replaced by the daily news program Newsroom Tokyo on weekdays, except holidays, at 20:00 JST (replaying at 3:00 JST the following morning).

On March 30, 2020, NHK implemented a new policy for referring to Japanese names, following the common practice in the Japanese language of listing the surname first followed by the given name. The new policy extends to all of NHK's English-language programming, including NHK Newsline. For example, Shinzō Abe (the former Prime Minister) is referred to as Abe Shinzō under the new policy.

Effective March 31, 2025, NHK Newsline reverted to a 30-minute format, bringing an end to Newsline In-Depth and Newsline Biz. The 7pm slot was given to relay NHK News 7 with English interpretation on weekdays, marking the return of NHK's domestic news programming to the channel after 16 years. On September 5, 2026, NHK completed the implementation of the new news center and moved Newsline from (North Building NHK broadcasting center (北館)) which has been in use since the 80s to the new studio at Information center Building NHK broadcasting center.

== Format ==
NHK Newsline updates viewers on the latest hard news with a focus mainly on Japan, the rest of Asia, and then finally around the world. Some editions feature segments focusing on Southeast Asia hosted by an anchor based in Bangkok. Feature segments follow, with business news and a global weather forecast. NHK Newsline is anchored by established NHK news presenters. The anchors speak entirely in English. English dubbing or occasional English subtitling if needed (previously just English subtitles until after 2011) are used in video footage when the spoken language is other than English. All measurements, including temperatures, are given in metric. Monetary figures are measured in Japanese yen, and figures in United States dollars are often also included. During periods of breaking news, Newsline is usually extended past its normal time slot.

== Anchors and reporters ==
=== Main anchors ===
- Minori Takao – chief anchor and executive producer, NHK World
- Ryuichi Yoshikawa – main anchor, NHK International Broadcasting Corporation
- Kyoko Tashiro – main anchor, NHK International Broadcasting Corporation
- Hiroaki Yamaguchi – main anchor, NHK International Broadcasting Corporation

=== NHK World anchors ===
- Yoshi Ogasawara
- Raja Pradhan
- Keiko Kitagawa
- Kanako Sachno
- Ross Mihara
- Maria Sato
- James Tengan

=== News ===
Weekdays (30–minute program)
Week A
08:00 JST – 14:00 JST (Monday) – Yoshi Ogasawara
11:00 JST – 14:00 JST (Tuesday to Friday) – Yoshi Ogasawara
15:00 JST – 18:00 JST – Kyoko Tashiro (Monday to Thursday) / Kanako Sachno (Friday) / James Tengan (Friday)
20:00 JST – 02:00 JST – Raja Pradhan – anchors for Newsroom Tokyo with Naoko Nishiumi
Week B
08:00 JST – 14:00 JST (Monday) – James Tengan / Minori Takao (twice a week)
11:00 JST – 14:00 JST (Tuesday to Friday) – Keiko Kitagawa (Tuesday, Thursday, or Friday) / Minori Takao (twice a week) / James Tengan / Maria Sato (Wednesday or Thursday) / Yoshi Ogasawara (occasional)
15:00 JST – 18:00 JST – Hiroaki Yamaguchi (if Yoshikawa reports on Newsroom Tokyo) / Ryuichi Yoshikawa (if Yamaguchi reports on Newsroom Tokyo) / Kanako Sachno (Friday) / James Tengan (Friday)
20:00 JST – 02:00 JST – Ryiuchi Yoshikawa (Monday to Thursday) / Hiroaki Yamaguchi (Monday to Thursday) / Raja Pradhan (Friday) – anchors for Newsroom Tokyo with Ayako Kumei

Weekends (10-minute program)
Week A
11:00 JST – 14:00 JST (Saturday) – Keiko Kitagawa
08:00 JST – 14:00 JST (Sunday) – Keiko Kitagawa
15:00 JST – 18:00 JST – Maria Sato / Yuko Fukushima (occasional, if Sato is absent)
19:00 JST – 02:00 JST – Kanako Sachno
03:00 JST – 07:00 JST – Ross Mihara

Week B
11:00 JST – 14:00 JST (Saturday) – Keiko Kitagawa
08:00 JST – 14:00 JST (Sunday) – James Tengan
15:00 JST – 18:00 JST – Maria Sato / Yuko Fukushima (occasional, if Sato is absent)
19:00 JST – 02:00 JST – Kanako Sachno
03:00 JST – 07:00 JST – Ross Mihara

National holidays, New Year's Day, or end of year (10 to 15-minute program)
11:00 JST – 14:00 JST – Yoshi Ogasawara / Keiko Kitagawa
15:00 JST – 18:00 JST – Maria Sato / Yuko Fukushima (occasional, if Sato is absent)
19:00 JST – 02:00 JST – Ramin Mellegard / James Tengan / Raja Pradhan
03:00 JST – 10:00 JST – Ross Mihara

=== Politics ===
- Masayo Nakajima – Senior political commentator and deputy editor-in-chief, NHK's Tokyo HQ
- Akihiro Mikoda – Senior political and economics commentator
- Shogo Takahashi – NHK World Executive Producer
- Takashi Ichinose – special affairs commentator, NHK's Tokyo HQ
- Miki Ebara – editor-in-chief, NHK's Washington Bureau
- Mayuko Ambe – Politics reporter
- Tomoko Kamata – Politics reporter
- Kim Chan-ju – NHK Seoul Bureau

=== Business ===
(all times listed are in Japanese Standard Time)

- Yuko Fukushima – Anchor / Presenter, Newsline and Newsline Asia 24
- Gene Otani – Anchor / Presenter, Biz Stream
- Shaula Vogue – Reporter / Presenter, Biz Stream and Design Talks Plus
- Ramin Mellegard – Anchor / Presenter, Newsline and Newsline Asia 24

=== Weather ===
- Yuumi Hirano – meteorologist for Newsroom Tokyo and other Newsline programs (every Thursday and Friday afternoon)
- Jonathan Oh – meteorologist for Newsroom Tokyo and other Newsline programs (every Monday, Tuesday, and Wednesday afternoon)
- Tsietsei Monare – meteorologist for Newsline Asia 24 and other Newsline programs (every Monday, Tuesday, and Wednesday morning)
- Yoko Komagata – meteorologist for Newsline Asia 24 and other Newsline programs (every Thursday and Friday morning)
- Sayaka Mori – meteorologist for Newsroom Tokyo and other Newsline programs (making intermittent quarterly appearances)

=== Other anchors ===
- Catherine Kobayashi – NHK New York Bureau, anchors NHK Newsline from New York, alternating weekdays from 05:00–10:00 JST
- Yuki Inoue – NHK New York Bureau, anchors NHK Newsline from New York, alternating weekdays from 05:00–10:00 JST
- Ayako Kumei – anchors Newsroom Tokyo, alternating weekdays with Hiroaki Yamaguchi or Ryuichi Yoshikawa (Mondays to Thursdays) and Raja Pradhan (Friday only)
- Naoko Nishiumi – anchors Newsroom Tokyo, alternating weekdays with Raja Pradhan
- Dhra Dhirakaosal – NHK Bangkok Bureau, also reports for Newsline Asia 24 and Newsroom Tokyo (primarily on Thursdays & Fridays)
- Cholaphansa Narula – NHK Bangkok Bureau, also reports for Newsline Asia 24 and Newsroom Tokyo (mostly Tuesdays)
- Roselyn Debhavalya – NHK Bangkok Bureau, also reports for Newsline Asia 24 and Newsroom Tokyo (primarily Mondays & Wednesdays)
- Erika Morishita – anchors NHK Newsline and Newsline Asia 24 on an intermittent basis
- Yoko Nishimura – anchors NHK Newsline and Newsline Asia 24 on an intermittent basis

=== Former on-air staff ===
- Miki Yamamoto – Anchor NHK Newsline and Newsline Asia 24 (departed in May 2026; now works as a full-time anchor at NHK Tokyo department)
- Marie Yanaka – Business reporter for Newsroom Tokyo (departed on 1 September 2026; left NHK World)
- Hajime Koga – Anchor NHK Newsline (departed in 2023; now works as a full-time anchor at NHK Nagasaki department)
- Aki Shibuya – Anchor Newsroom Tokyo NHK Newsline and Newsline Asia 24 (departed on 27 March 2026)
- Rina Yamasawa – Anchor Newsroom Tokyo (departed on 27 March 2026; now anchors International News Report at NHK)
- Sayuri Hori – Anchor (departed in 2025)
- Takuma Yoshioka – Anchor Newsroom Tokyo (departed on 28 March 2025; now works as chief editor for NHK World)
- Aiko Doden – Presenter, Newsline In Depth (departed in 2024)
- Rika Kawasaki – Anchor (departed in 2025)
- Hiro Morita – Anchor (departed in 2022, still active as Grand Sumo Sportcaster)
- Ai Uchida – Anchor (departed in 2021)
- Hideki Nakayama – Anchor Newsroom Tokyo (departed on 22 July 2020)
- Carley Gomez – Meteorologist (departed in 2019; now at KABC-TV Los Angeles, California)
- Robert Speta – Meteorologist (departed in 2017; now at WTLV-TV Jacksonville, Florida)
- Sho Beppu – Anchor Newsroom Tokyo (departed on 6 June 2017)
- Mai Shoji – Weather presenter (departed in 2015; now at Tokyo FM)
- Ron Madison – Business Anchor (departed in 2015)
- Yuko Aotani – Anchor (departed in 2015)
- John LaDue – Reporter / TSE Broadcasts
- Phoebe Amoroso – Reporter/ TSE Broadcasts
- Sherry Ahn Jisu – Anchor (departed in 2015; now at Bloomberg Television)
- Miwa Gardner – Weather presenter (departed in 2012; now at Google)
- Asumi Ukon – Anchor (departed in 2005)
- Hirokazu Sakamaki – Anchor (departed in 2008)
- Hisashi Okawa – Anchor (departed in 2005)
- Kazuko Kitano – Anchor (departed in 2004)
- Keikichi Hanada – Anchor (departed in 2019)

== Distribution ==
NHK Newsline is rated as one of the top English-language news programs in the Asia Pacific region. NHK Newsline competes in the Asian news market with China's CCTV-9 News on CGTN; South Korea's Arirang News on Arirang TV; Singapore's Asia Now on CNA; various news programs like Rundown and The World Tonight on the ABS-CBN News Channel from the Philippines; and ABC Australia News on the ABC Australia network. In the United States, NHK Newsline airs on the PBS World Channel at 2:00pm Pacific Time Zone on weekdays and on Link TV daily.

== See also ==
- BBC World News, top of the hour daily newscast aired on BBC World News
- DW News, top of the hour daily newscast aired on DW-TV
- Newshour, top of the hour daily newscast aired on Al Jazeera English
