= Biz Stream =

- Presented by: Shaula Vogue; Gene otanei
- Country of origin: Japan
- Original language: English
- No. of seasons: 3
- No. of episodes: 102

Production
- Production locations: NHK Broadcasting Center, Shibuya, Tokyo, Japan
- Running time: 28 minutes
- Production companies: NHK, Telecom Staff

Original release
- Network: NHK World-Japan
- Release: April 7, 2018 – present

Biz Stream is a weekly business news programme aired on NHK's international broadcasting service NHK World-Japan, hosted by Shaula Vogue and Gene otanei. It premiered 7 April 2018; it airs three times a month, on weekends, with an extra repeat on Wednesday early mornings (JST).

The programme usually enters hiatus from late April to early May (Golden Week), in late summer, and from mid-December to mid-January. Due to the COVID-19 pandemic in Japan, the programme entered a five-week hiatus, starting 18 April 2020 and ending 23 May 2020.

Biz Stream aired its 100th episode on 15 May 2021.

== Format ==
Biz Stream is an "upbeat business programme" dealing with the top business stories and "the latest innovations" from Japan and elsewhere. Every episode includes analysis by an expert guest and starts with a review of the main business headlines of the week.

The main segments are:

- In Depth deals with a business story out of the headlines reviewed at the start of the show.
- On-Site Report features a story of an issue affecting the Japanese or Asia-Pacific business community or their economy, and the way companies deal with it.
- World Perspective is a report from outside Japan, mostly from the Asia Pacific and Southeast Asia regions.
- Global Trends is a feature about sustainable, innovative products and entrepreneurship.

Occasionally, there are special episodes dealing only with one issue, such as a review of the Heisei era from the business side or an investigation on plastic waste exported to Southeast Asia.

The programme is also available on online service NHK Huayu Shijie, broadcast as Shāngyè Xìnxī Liú BIZ STREAM (simplified Chinese: 商业信息流 BIZ STREAM; traditional Chinese: 商業信息流 BIZ STREAM) with Simplified Chinese subtitles.

== Personalities ==
=== Hosts ===
- Shaula Vogue
- Gene otanei

==== Former hosts ====
- Raja Pradhan (2021-2026)
- Phoebe Amoroso (2018-2021)

=== Reporters ===
- Marie Yanaka
- John LaDue

=== Experts ===
- Makiko Eda, chief representative office of the World Economic Forum Japan
- Akie Iriyama, professor at the Waseda Business School
- Joseph Kraft, CEO of Rorschach Advisory
- Lee Chiwoong, chief economist at Mitsubishi UFJ Morgan Stanley Securities
- Yumiko Murakami, head of the OECD Tokyo Centre
- Martin Schulz, chief policy economist at Fujitsu
- Ken Shibusawa, founder and chairman of Commons Asset Management
- Jonathan Soble, visiting fellow, Asia Pacific Initiative
- Rintaro Tamaki, president of the Japan Center for International Finance (JCIF)
