= NHK World-Japan =

International service of NHK

- Type: Broadcasting news, discussions, state media
- Country: Japan
- Broadcast area: Worldwide (International)
- Headquarters: Tokyo, Japan

Programming
- Languages: Japanese, English
- Picture format: 1080i 16:9 (HDTV)

Ownership
- Owner: Government of Japan
- Parent: NHK
- Sister channels: NHK General TV; NHK Educational TV; NHK BS; NHK BS Premium 4K; NHK BS8K

History
- Launched: April 1, 1998; 28 years ago
- Former names: NHK World

Links
- Website: www.nhk.or.jp/nhkworld/

Availability

Terrestrial
- Digital terrestrial television (United States): List: Channel 8.4 Houston (Houston); Channel 9.4 Utah (KUEN); Channel 11.2 Honolulu (KHET); Channel 12.4 Denver (KBDI); Channel 21.3 New York City (WLIW); Channel 22.3 San Francisco (KRCB); Channel 24.4 Orlando (WUCF); Channel 28.2 Tacoma-Seattle (KBTC); Channel 28.3 Los Angeles (KCET); Channel 30.2 Atlanta (WABE-TV); Channel 56.2 Chicago (WYIN); Channel 57.2 Plattsburgh (WCFE); Channel 60.3 San Francisco (KPJK); Channels x.4 Maryland (MPT)

Streaming media
- NHK World-Japan: Watch live (available worldwide)
- NHK World Radio Japan: Listen live (available worldwide)

NHK World-Japan (formerly and also known simply as NHK World) is the international arm of the Japanese public broadcaster NHK. Its services are aimed at the overseas market, similar to those offered by other national public-service broadcasters, such as the British BBC (BBC World Service, the international feed of the BBC News channel, etc.), France 24, or the German DW. Contents are broadcast through shortwave radio, satellite, and cable operators throughout the world, as well as online and through its mobile apps. It is headquartered in Tokyo.

NHK World-Japan currently provides three main broadcast services: an English-language current affairs TV channel (NHK World TV), a multilingual radio service (NHK World Radio Japan), and a Japanese-language general/entertainment TV service (NHK World Premium). NHK World-Japan also makes most of its programming available through its website (either live or on demand). A Chinese version of the channel, NHK Huayu Shijie (NHK华语视界), which essentially provides news and select programs from NHK World-Japan with Mandarin dubbing and/or subtitles, was launched on January 15, 2019, and is only distributed online.

== History ==
NHK World changed to its current name in April 2018, as an effort to "establish wider global recognition" as a service with "Japanese roots".

On March 30, 2020, NHK World-Japan implemented a new policy for referring to Japanese names, following the common practice in the Japanese language of listing the surname first followed by the given name, in line with "moves in Japan in general".

== Television ==
=== NHK World TV (rolling news channel) ===

NHK World TV started broadcasting services for North America and Europe in 1995. On April 1, 1998, then-called NHK World Television started broadcasting. Today's NHK World-Japan is a current affairs and cultural channel that broadcasts internationally via satellite and cable TV. Programming is produced in English only. It began as a news channel in February 2009. NHK World-Japan's free-to-air broadcasts have been available in HD by satellite since then.

NHK World-Japan HD currently broadcasts from Intelsat 19 166°E, 68.5°E, Astra 19.2°E, Hot Bird 13°E, 58°W, to SES-3 103°W. In the United States, NHK World-Japan is available on DirecTV channels 322 and 2049.

Some of the shows are produced by production studio JIB TV, which is 60% owned by NHK with the remaining 40% owned by private investors like Microsoft and Japanese bank Mizuho. The NHK World-Japan digital on-screen graphic is not used at all when shows produced by JIB TV air as paid programming.

NHK World TV in HD Version is also currently available on Rogers Cable channel 122 in Western Canada including Rogers Ignite TV.

On September 5, 2026, the channel and NHK World Premium started broadcasting from the new news building built at the NHK Broadcasting Center.

==== Programs ====
TV programs by NHK World-Japan include:

- Begin Japanology and Japanology Plus: A Japanese culture and lifestyle television show with Peter Barakan.
- Biz Stream: A weekly business news program featuring the main stories of the week with guest expert analysis.
- Cool Japan: Hosted by Shoji Kokami and Risa Stegmayer; some aspects of Japanese customs are considered "cool" by foreigners. Cool Japan is a television show that illustrates the quickly changing Japanese culture and how it is perceived by the international community that have recently made Japan their home.
- J-Melo: A music program hosted by May J., featuring the latest developments in Japanese music, selections of hit songs, and diverse material from a wide range of different music genres: pop, rock, jazz, and classical.
- NHK Newsline: A news program with updates every hour, covering world events and business-related news, as well as providing global weather forecasts.
- NHK News 7: A simulcast of nightly NHK domestic news program with English audio interpretation.
- Somewhere Street: A travel program which explores a different city each episode, from a tourist's perspective walking through a city.
- Today's Close-up: A current affairs program from the NHK's domestic network
- Kawaii International, a program devoted to kawaii fashion and culture.

Most recently, NHK World-Japan has promoting selections of their J-drama lineups under NHK Drama Showcase.

=== NHK World Premium (entertainment channel) ===
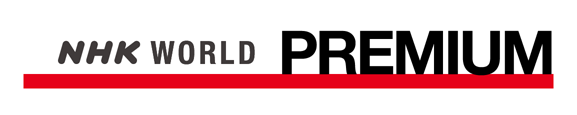

NHK World Premium broadcasts a mixture of news, sports and entertainment in Japanese language worldwide, via satellite and cable providers, as the pay TV service mostly targeted at Japanese expatriates. All the contents generally do not carry English subtitles (with optional English dubbing available in newscasts and some special events).

It is marketed as premium TV channel with that very name in nearly every single countries across the globe, such as Asia Pacific (outside Japan), Latin America and EMEA. NHK World Premium was also broadcast in the US through Jme, a specialized streaming platform operated by NHK Cosmomedia America, who previously run the pay TV channel TV Japan (テレビジャパン) until it goes offline on March 31, 2024. Their contents in Europe were previously shown on JSTV-branded subscription channels which under NHK Cosmomedia Europe.

=== Worldwide distribution and dubbing ===
NHK World partners with the Japan Media Communication Center (JAMCO) to distribute a selection of its programs worldwide, with a focus on providing programs for free to stations in developing countries. JAMCO handles dubbing into English, Spanish, French, Arabic and Chinese, and has supplied programs to over 100 countries.

== Radio ==
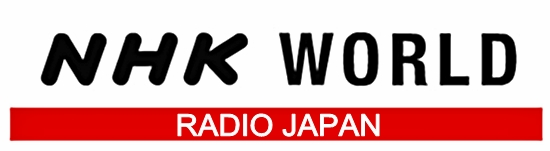

NHK World Radio Japan (RJ) is the international radio arm of NHK. It broadcasts a weekly lineup of news, current affairs, cultural, and educative radio program focusing on Japan and Asia, for a daily total of 65 hours of broadcasts.

Radio Japan provides two main feeds:

- The General Service broadcasts worldwide in Japanese and English.
- The Regional Service broadcasts to specific geographical zones in 17 languages: Arabic, Bengali, Burmese, Chinese, English, French, Hindi, Indonesian, Korean, Persian, Portuguese, Russian, Spanish, Swahili, Thai, Urdu, Vietnamese. Both services are available on shortwave (SW) as well as on the internet.

=== Radio Japan's shortwave relay stations ===
NHK World Radio Japan runs a domestic SW relay station on 9750 kHz from 8:00 to 16:00 UTC:

- Yamata

It also leases some hours by several external relay stations for English service in:

- United Kingdom
- United Arab Emirates
- Uzbekistan
- Myanmar
- Madagascar
- Vatican State - Vatican Radio
- France - Radio France Internationale

== Satellite and internet service ==
NHK World-Japan broadcasts via C-band and Ku-band satellites around the globe.

The programs and content are also available online.

- NHK World-Japan: online news (text) and live video stream of the rolling news channel
- NHK World Radio Japan: live radio streams, podcasts, and archive programming
- Learn Japanese: re-edited versions of series, such as Basic Japanese for You and Brush Up Your Japanese.

Only a limited number of programs are available online for free.

- NHK is available on Apple TV, Fire TV, and Roku streaming media players.

== See also ==
- Television in Japan
- International broadcasting in Japan
- International news channels
