= John Daub =

American YouTuber covering aspects of life in Japan

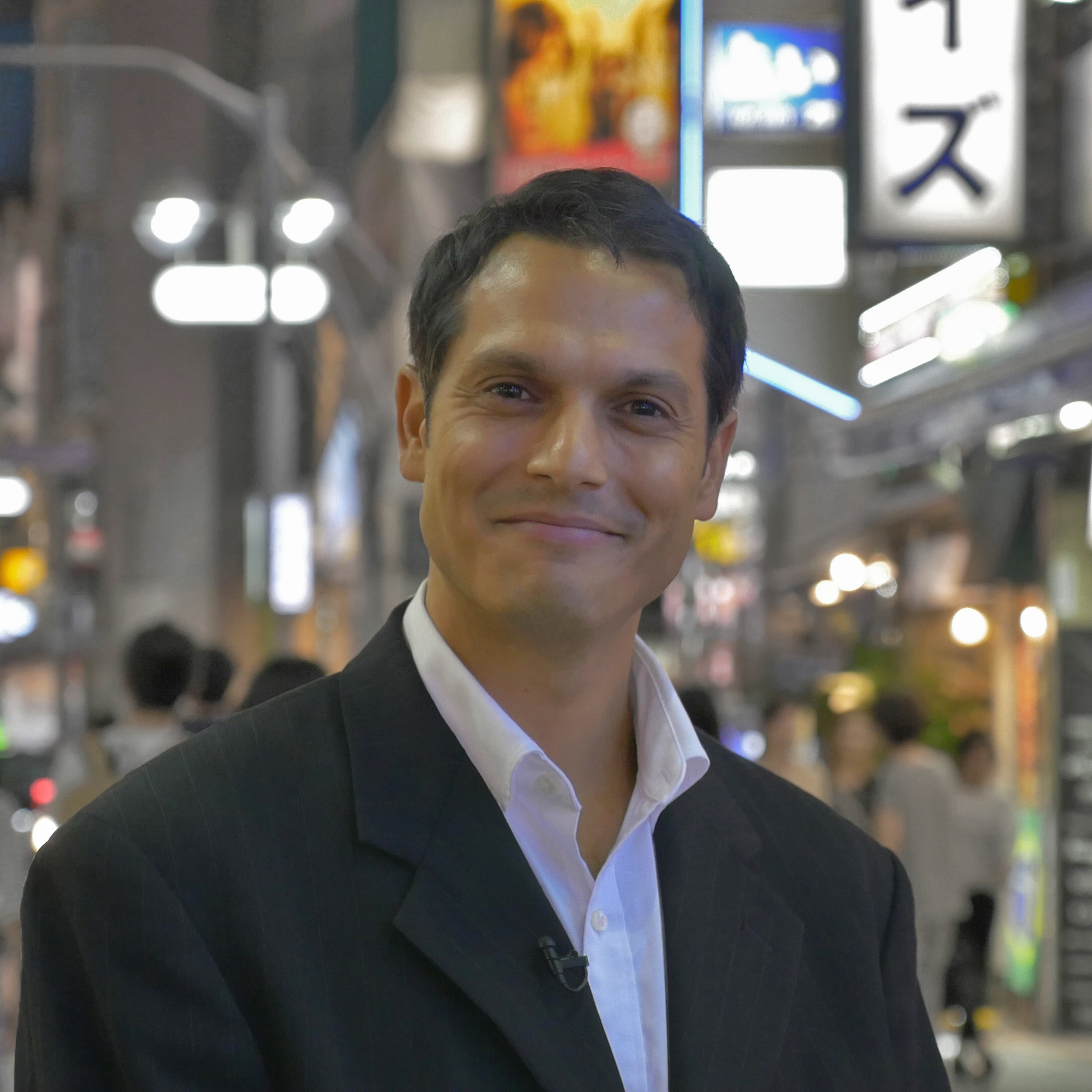
- Born: Virginia, US
- Education: Ohio State University

YouTube information
- Channels: ONLY in JAPAN * John Daub; ONLY in JAPAN * GO; ONLY in JAPAN 360
- Years active: 2012-present
- Genre: Travel
- Subscribers: 697,700+
- Views: 116,813,240
- Last updated: 16 August 2026
- Website: onlyinjapan.tv

John Daub is an American YouTuber and television presenter. He is best known for his YouTube channel Only in Japan, which focuses on Japanese culture, food, history and travel.

== Early life ==
Daub was born in Virginia and grew up in New Jersey. He is a graduate of Ohio State University, where he studied English and economics. He first moved to Japan in 1998, where he initially worked as an English teacher.

== Career ==
=== Television ===
Daub launched a production company in Japan after filming his first professional video in 2003, and was contracted to create comedy videos in English. He would later join NHK World-Japan as a reporter and presenter, contributing to such programs as TOKYO EYE. He has also reported for the TBS daytime news program Hiruobi.

=== YouTube ===
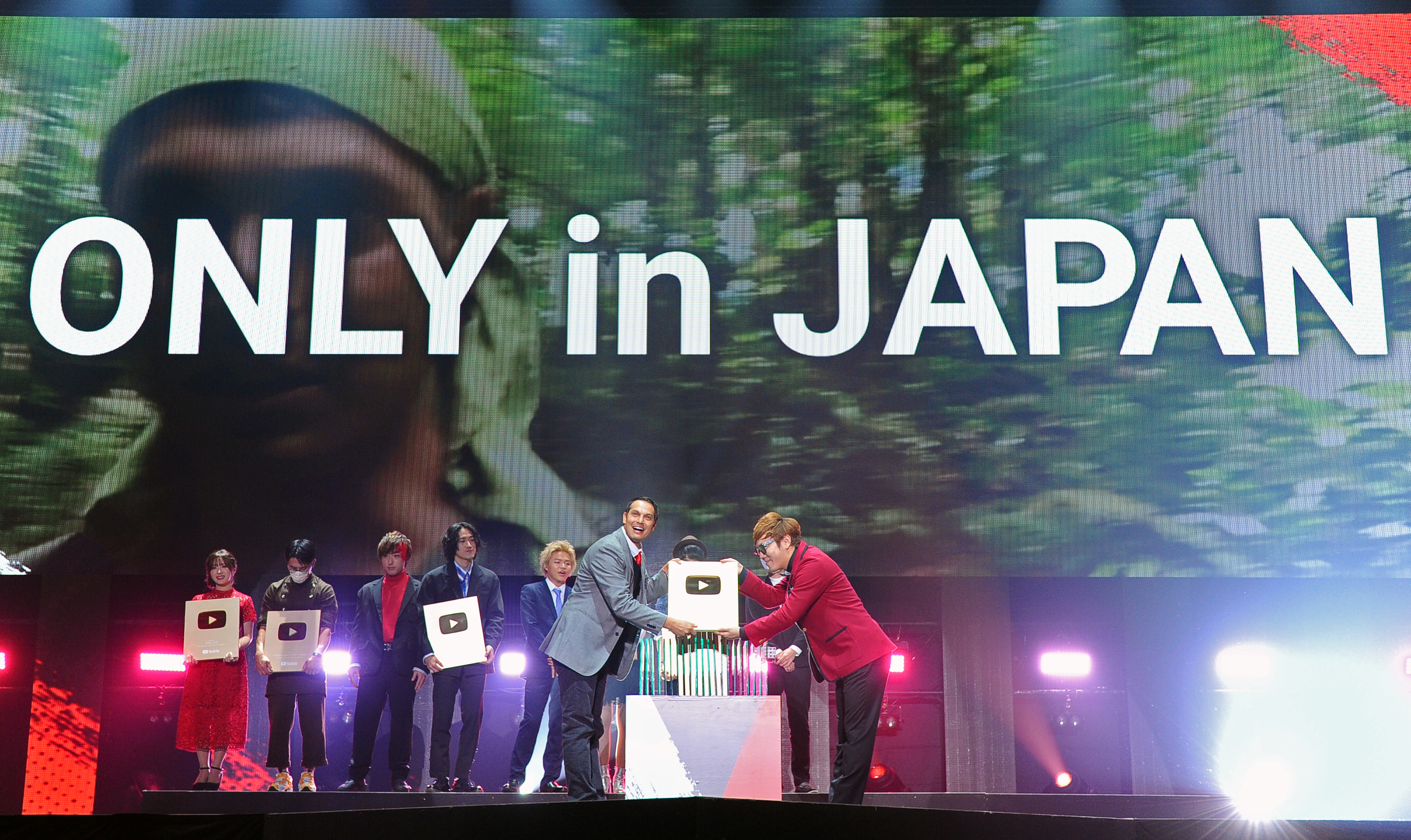
John Daub receiving the YouTube 1M Subscriber Creator Award from Hikakin at the YouTube FanFest Japan 2019

Following the Great Tohoku Earthquake on March 11, 2011, Daub decided to take his experience reporting for NHK World's Tokyo Eye program to YouTube to address misunderstandings about Japan resulting from incorrect portrayals in Western media, especially regarding Fukushima and Tohoku. He picked the name Only in Japan in reference to the quirky and often ridiculous image of Japan in social and mass media. In the series, Daub visits all 47 prefectures of Japan and covers Japanese food, culture, history, technology and tourist attractions.

One such video was "Highway through a Building Story", highlighting the ingenuity of threading a highway though a thin building in Osaka. In the video, Daub discussed the background and history of this design choice and drove through the highway. The video included inside shots and interviews. On February 28, 2013, Daub launched the WAO RYU!Only in Japan channel with the WAO Corporation.

In March 2017, Daub livestreamed himself hitchhiking the length of Japan.

He collected the YouTube 1 million subscriber award at the YouTube FanFest Japan 2019. In 2020, Daub announced he was leaving WAO RYU!Only in Japan to launch his new channel ONLY in JAPAN * John Daub. The new channel has an animated opening created by American-owned, Tokyo-based animation studio D'art Shtajio. With the launch of the new channel, Daub crowdfunded an event with the Japan Hanabi Association to help Japan's fireworks industry during the COVID-19 pandemic.

== Personal life ==
Daub is married to a Japanese woman named Kanae. They have one son, Leo.
