= Somewhere Street =

- Genre: Travel
- Presented by: Various
- Theme music composer: Shusei Murai
- Country of origin: Japan
- Original languages: Japanese, English

Production
- Camera setup: Steadicam
- Running time: Approx. 50 minutes (without advertisements)

Original release
- Network: NHK
- Release: March 29, 2005 – present

Somewhere Street (世界ふれあい街歩き, Sekai Fureai Machiaruki) is a Japanese television program produced and broadcast by NHK. It began airing in 2005, and the program is available on NHK's international English language service NHK World dubbed into English.

== Format ==
In each episode, the program visits a different city around the world. The program is shot nearly entirely from the first person perspective by steadicam. The single camera travels entirely on foot throughout the city each episode, occasionally stopping to admire a tourist attraction or stop to talk to local people. The episode shoots over a single day, usually from mid-morning to sunset. The program is narrated by a presenter who is always behind the camera, and is never shown or seen. The narrator gives a walking commentary about where he or she currently is and the sights surrounding him or her throughout the episode, and also talks to some locals to ask questions about the area. The narrator is dubbed when speaking the local language to a local citizen while any locals are subtitled.

Four episodes, around 15 minutes long each, were also produced, called "Somewhere Street: A Little Stroll."

There are also a few segments each episode called 'information corner', where a local tour guide or tourist official explains things about the history of the city, popular local foods, short day trip, or a particular attraction. These segments are delivered straight to camera, unlike the rest of the program.

== English edition ==
While the program is primarily produced for a domestic audience, the program airs in English on NHK World. The program remains the same as the Japanese equivalent, with the exception that the narrator speaks fluent English throughout the program instead of Japanese.
