= Terunobu =

- Gender: Male

Origin
- Origin: Japanese
- Meaning: Different meanings depending on the kanji used

Terunobu (written: 照信 or 晃伸) is a masculine Japanese given name. Notable people with the name include:

- Terunobu Fujimori (藤森 照信; born 1946), Japanese architect and architectural historian
- Terunobu Maeda (前田 晃伸; born 1945), Japanese banker and chief executive
