= Ross Mihara =

American journalist

- Born: c. 1963 (age 62–63); Los Angeles, California, US
- Education: University of Washington; Waseda University
- Occupations: News anchor; news producer; sports commentator; radio host
- Years active: c. 1986–present
- Employers: KITV; KINE-FM; KGMB; NHK
- Known for: NHK Newsline; Grand Sumo Highlights

Ross T. Mihara (ロス・ミハラ (Rosu Mihara); born c. 1963) is an American journalist. After working in broadcasting in Hawaii, he moved to Japan in 1994 where he became an English-language sumo commentator and news anchor for NHK.

== Early life ==
Mihara was born c. 1963 in Los Angeles, California. In c. 1968 he moved with his family to Aiea, Hawaii. He attended high school at the ʻIolani School and graduated in 1981. He subsequently majored in business administration at the University of Washington. After graduation he worked for a bank in Seattle as a loan officer.

Although he had no prior experience, Mihara began to pursue a career in broadcasting c. 1986. He told the Honolulu Star-Advertiser in 2012 that in his childhood he had admired anchorman Bob Sevey and realized his ideal job had been "right in front of [his] eyes". Mihara was hired as a desk assistant at KOMO, the ABC affiliate in Seattle. After working there for a year, he aspired to work on-camera and began sending out his résumé to television stations across the United States. A news director at KITV in Honolulu responded with a job offer for assistant producer that was contingent on moving back to Hawaii; Mihara accepted.

== Career ==
While at KITV, Mihara also worked as a radio host for KINE-FM. He was hired by CBS affiliate KGMB as a reporter in June 1989. The resignation of the station's weekday sports anchor led to Mihara's appointment as successor in the role. He later said that "it was a lot of fun to sit next to people [he] grew up watching". In addition to duties at KGMB, Mihara also volunteered to raise money for charitable causes. His charitable activities included playing on a softball team and auctioning himself off on a date at an event billed as "Bidding for Bachelors, A Ladies' Night Out". The latter was held in 1993 at the Ala Moana Hotel; Mark DeCarlo, then the host of the dating program Studs, was the master of ceremonies. Mihara left KGMB in January 1994. In an announcement made that month, Mihara said his decision was voluntary and motivated by feelings of burnout, as well as a desire to move on. A column published in 2000 in the Honolulu Star-Bulletin said that he was fired by a newly-hired director, an outcome that Mihara was said to have considered the best thing that ever happened to him.

After working at KGMB, Mihara traveled to Tokyo. A former colleague at KITV introduced him to managerial staff at NHK, who were looking for a commentator for sumo matches. He accepted the job, despite not being knowledgeable in the sport. "I didn't know a yorikiri from hara-kiri", he said in a 1999 interview. He also had never taken a special interest in the Japanese language despite being a yonsei. "I just wish I had studied harder during Japanese class when I was at the ʻIolani School", he said in 2000. Upon being hired by NHK, he enrolled at Waseda University to learn Japanese, "started studying [sumo] like crazy", and was coached on how to comment on sumo from Tom Quinn and Dave Wiggins, former colleagues at KGMB and KHON. Quinn and Wiggins had preceded Mihara as sumo commentators for NHK. Takamiyama, a Hawaiian-born former wrestler and oyakata, praised the speed and thoroughness of Mihara's learning of sumo. "You can tell he does his homework", Takamiyama said. "He is very easy to work with and has become very knowledgeable about sumo in a short time". Mihara said that he personally visited heya to meet with wrestlers and learn about their attributes. Each program takes about two or three hours' worth of research:

About 99 percent of what I say has to be ad-libbed, so you've really got to be prepared and know your stuff. It isn't like just reading the news.

He is currently the longest-serving commentator on Grand Sumo Highlights. In 2007, Mihara was appointed as one of the anchors of NHK Newsline. He also served as NHK's English-language speed skating commentator during the 1998 Winter Olympics in Nagano and baseball commentator. He also narrates voice-overs for commercials and corporate videos, including for The Walt Disney Company.

== Personal life ==
Mihara lives in Japan, but regularly visits Hawaii. Notwithstanding the challenge of learning Japanese, he said in 2012 that adjusting to life in Japan was easy. He added that he has never felt homesick for Hawaii because of the immediate accessibility of aspects of Hawaiian culture in Japan.
