= Jinnan, Shibuya =

District in Shibuya, Tokyo, Japan

Jinnan 神南
- Neighborhood in Shibuya
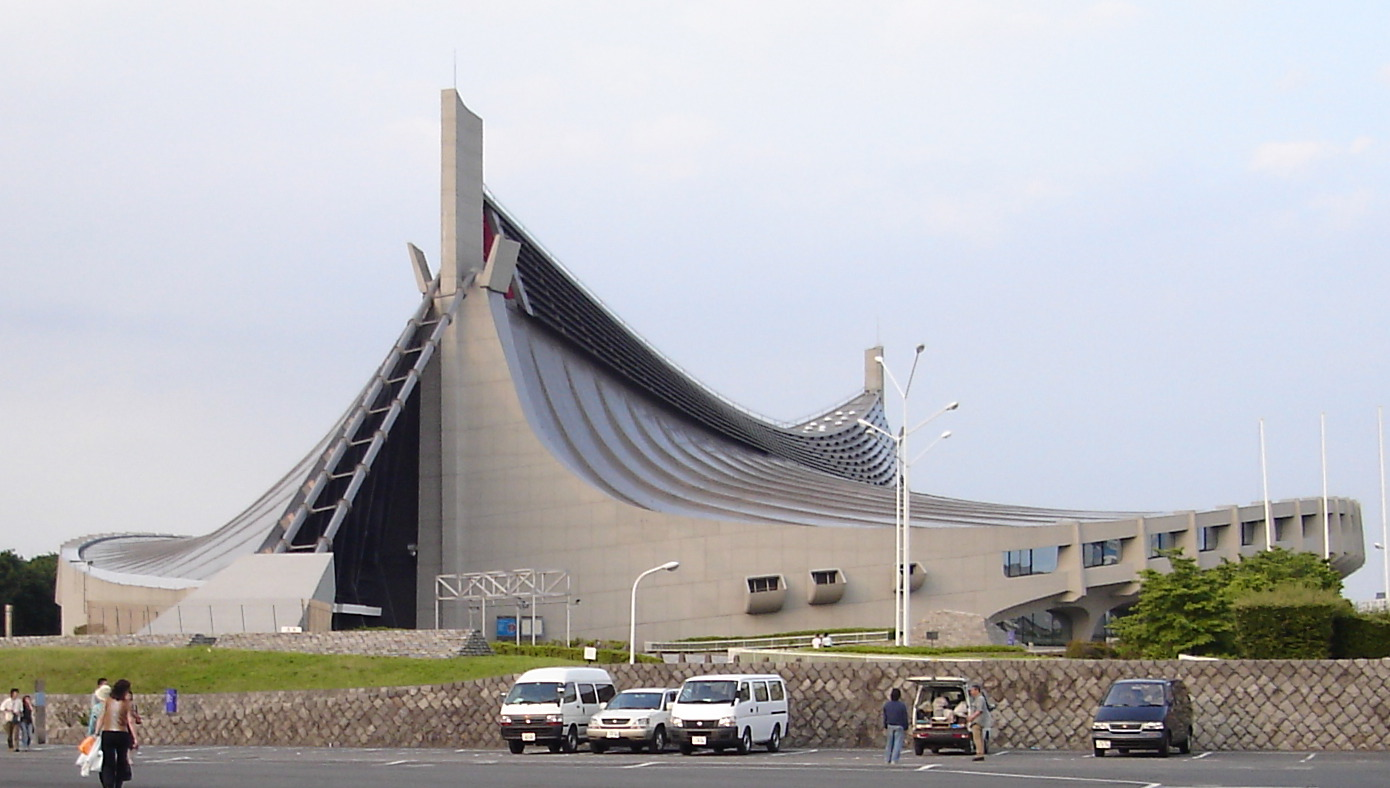
- Yoyogi National Gymnasium
- Interactive map of Jinnan
- Country: Japan
- Prefecture: Tokyo
- Special ward: Shibuya

Population (1 October 2020)
  - Total: 634
- Time zone: UTC+09:00
- ZIP code: 150-0041
- Telephone area code: 03

Jinnan (神南) is a district of Shibuya, Tokyo, Japan. As of October 2020, the population of this district is 634. The postal code for Jinnan is 150–0041.

Local landmarks in Jinnan include NHK Broadcasting Center, the Yoyogi National Gymnasium and Yoyogi Park. The nearest train stations are Shibuya and Harajuku.

== Education ==
Shibuya Board of Education operates public elementary and junior high schools. All of Jinnan (1 and 2 chome) is zoned to Jinnan Elementary School (神南小学校), and Shoto Junior High School (松濤中学校).

== Gallery ==
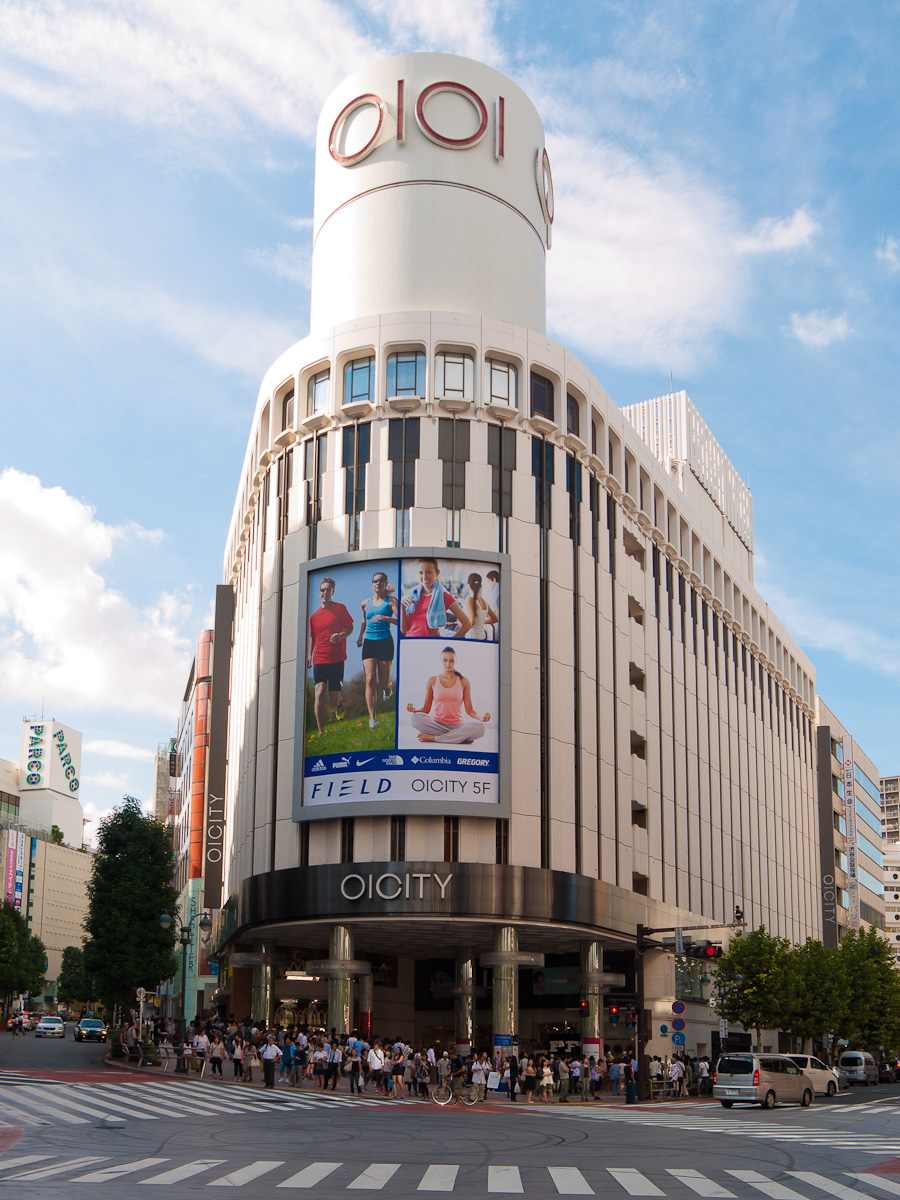
Marui City - now Shibuya Modi

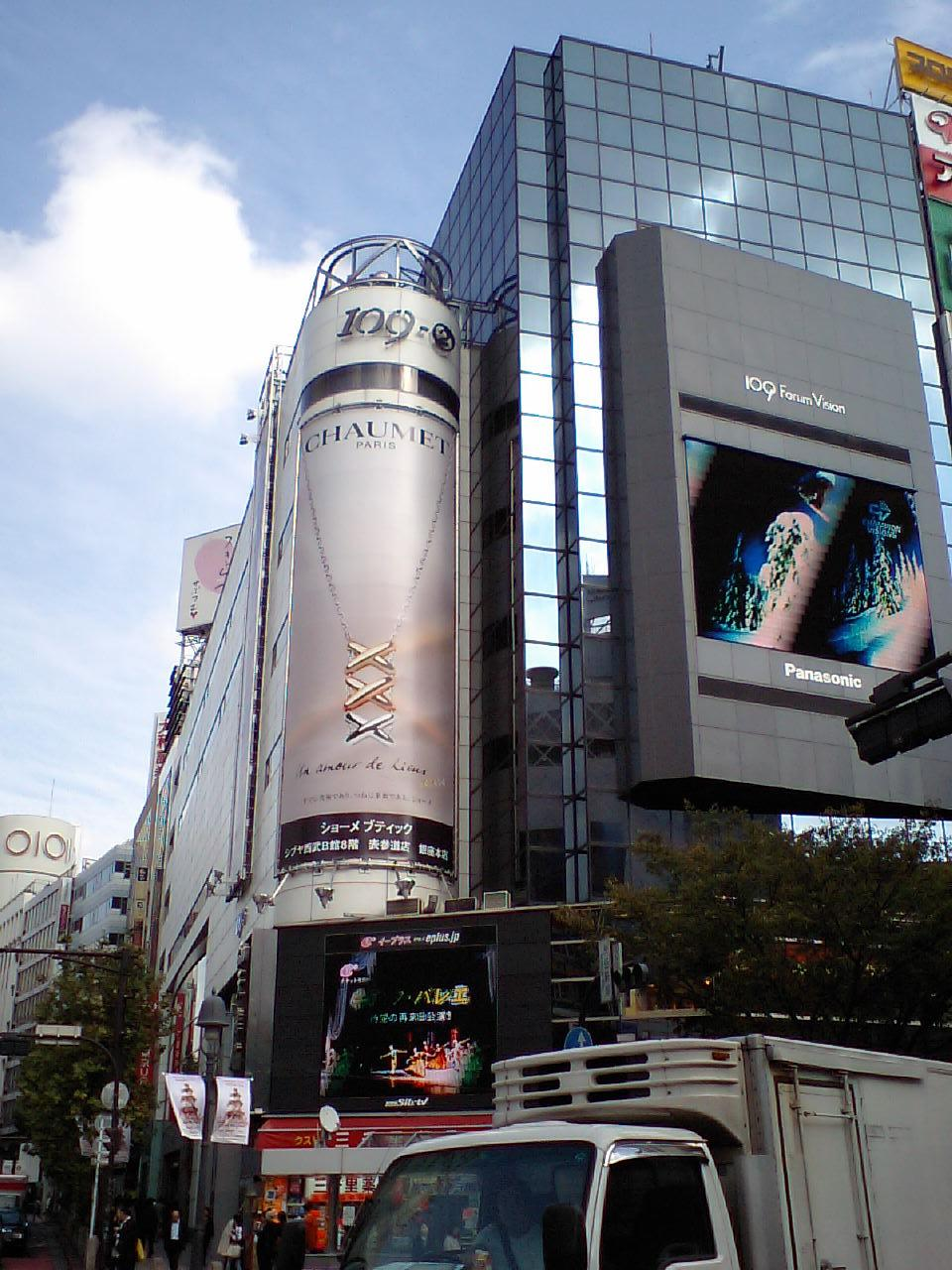
109-2 - now Magnet by Shibuya 109

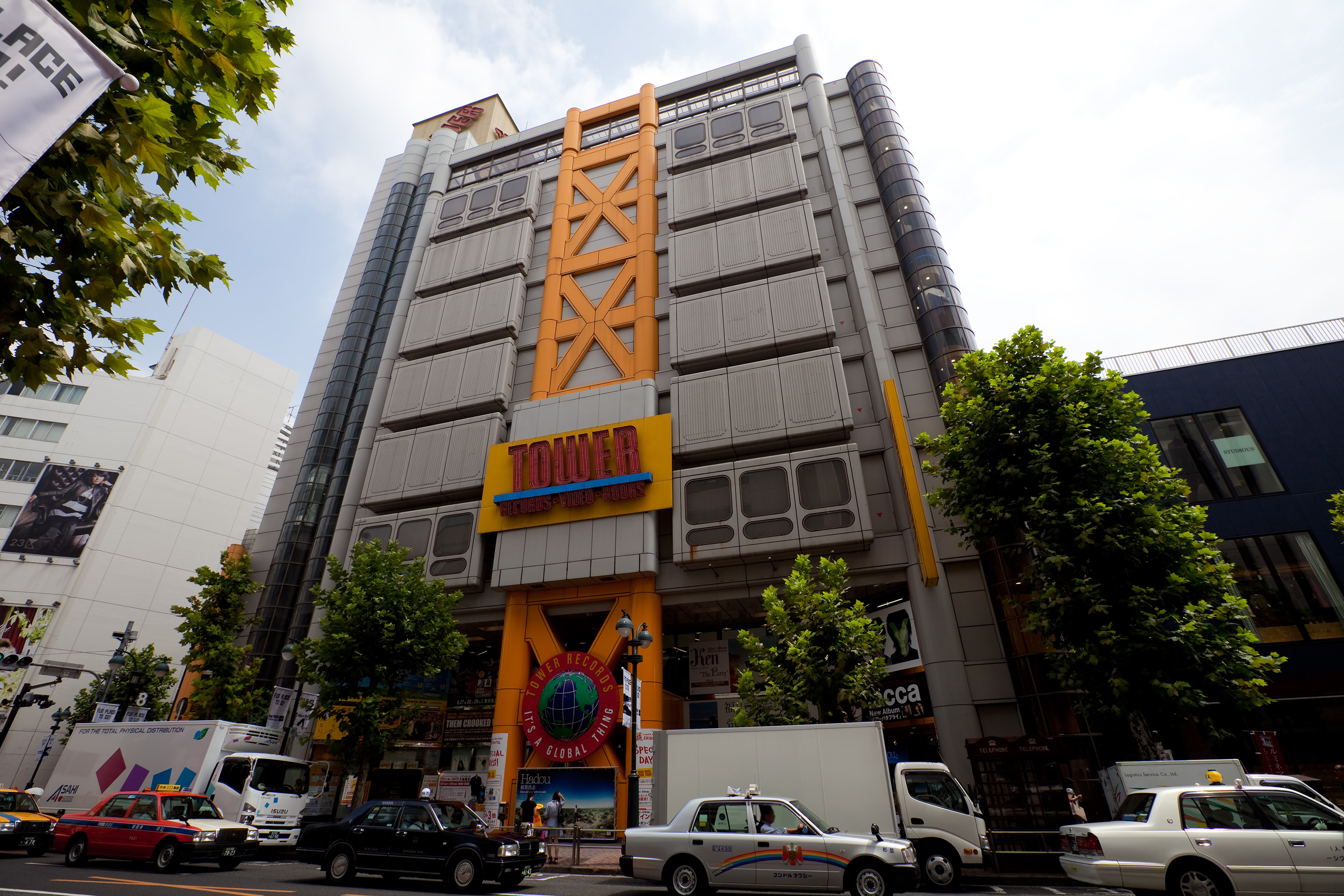
Tower Records

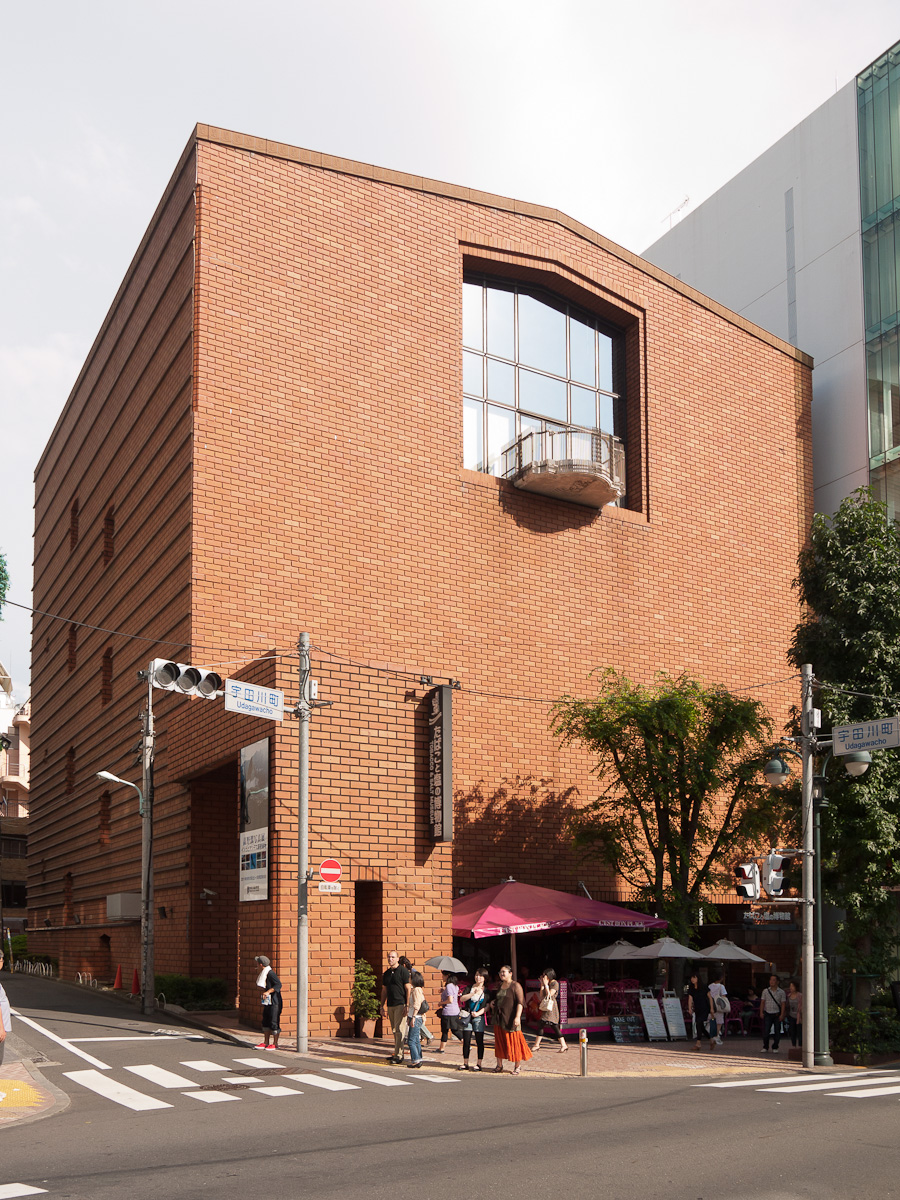
Tobacco & Salt Museum

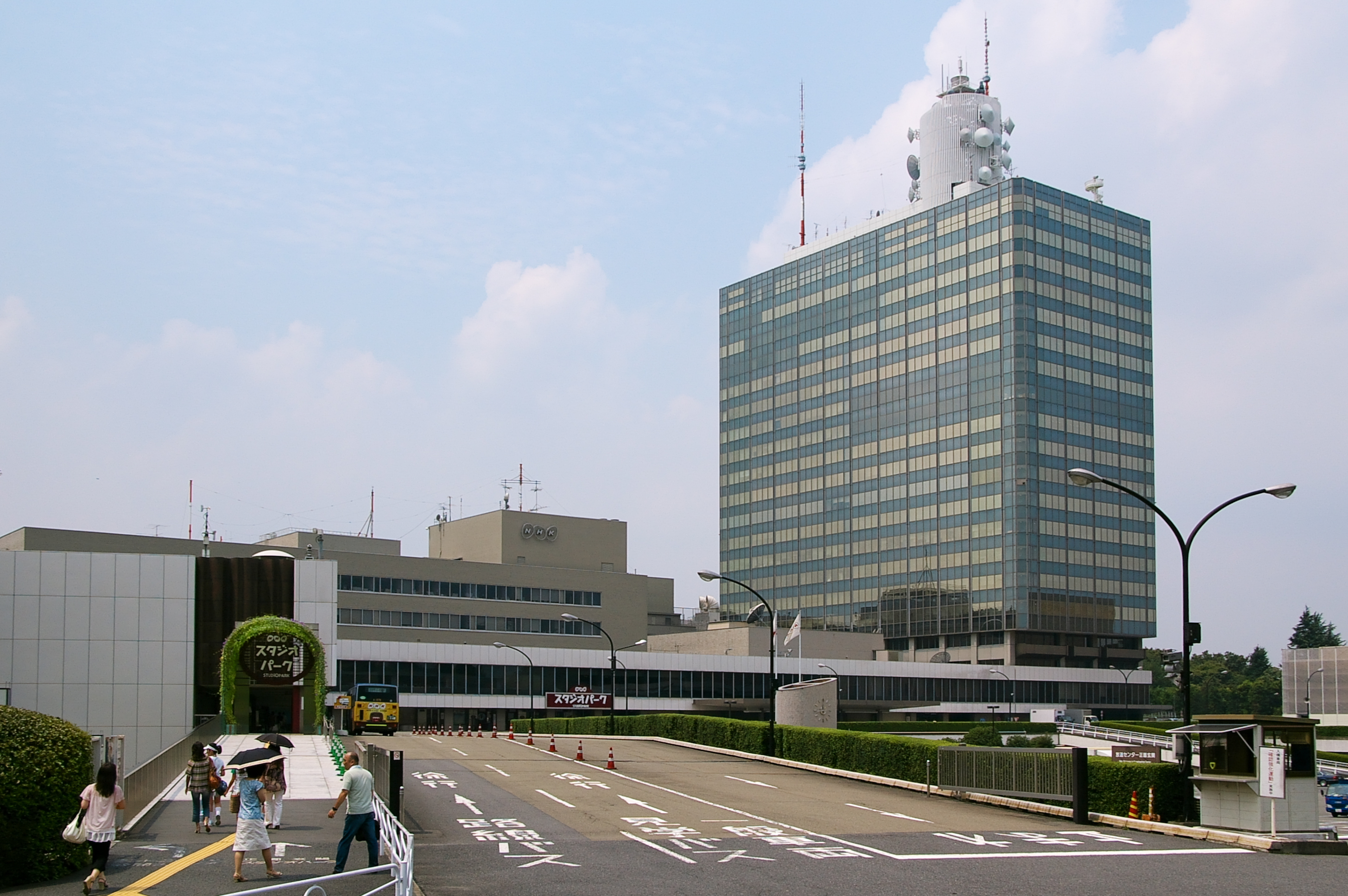
NHK Broadcasting Center

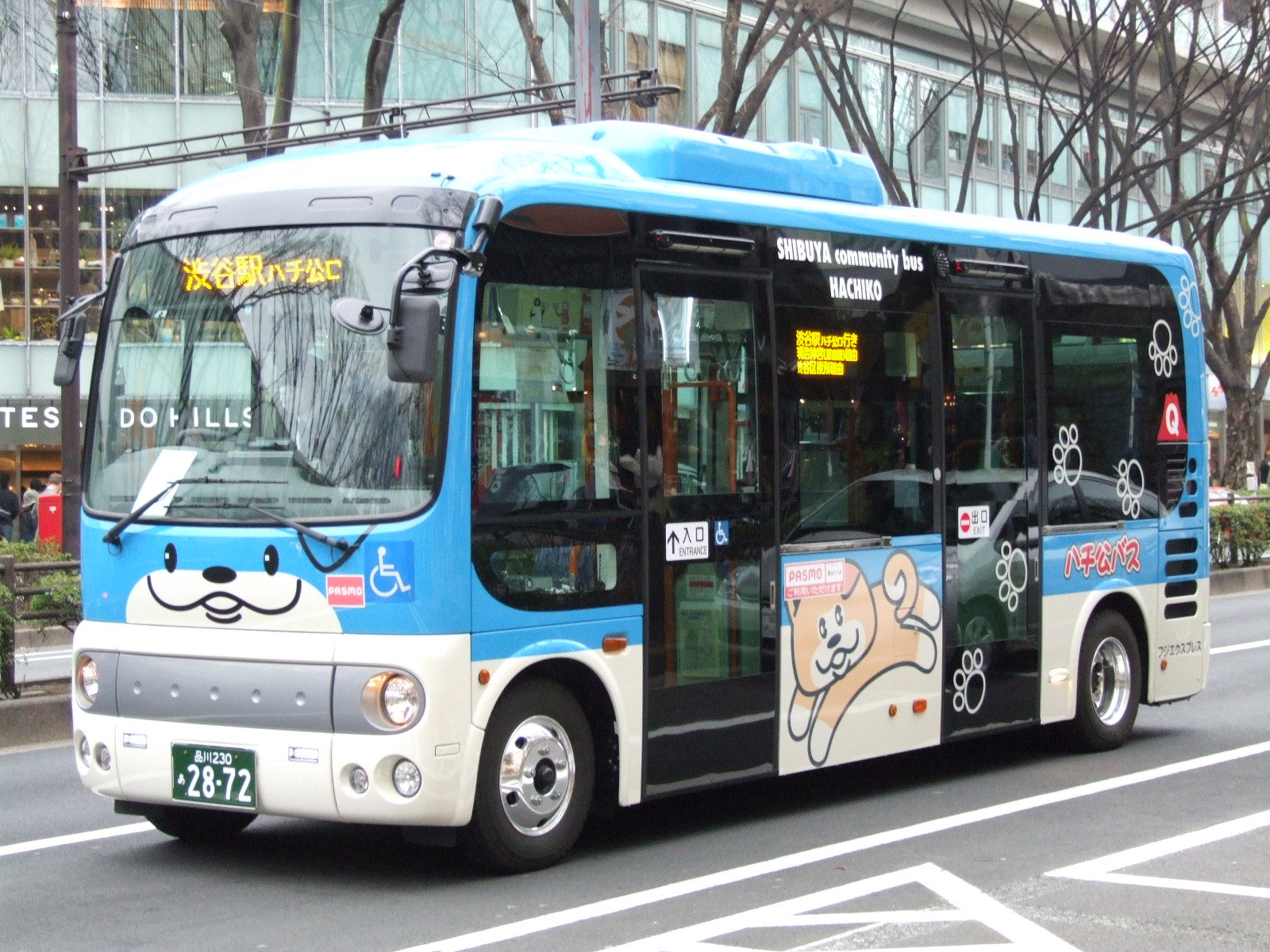
Hachiko Bus
