= NHK BS8K =

8K television channel owned by NHK

- Country: Japan
- Broadcast area: Nationwide
- Headquarters: NHK Broadcasting Center, Shibuya, Tokyo, Japan

Programming
- Language: Japanese
- Picture format: 4320p UHD TV

Ownership
- Owner: NHK
- Sister channels: NHK General TV; NHK Educational TV; NHK BS; NHK BS Premium 4K

History
- Launched: 1 December 2018

Availability

Terrestrial
- Digital terrestrial: Ch.8K 102

NHK BS8K is a satellite television broadcasting service offered by NHK. Launched on 1 December 2018, it is the world's first television channel to broadcast in 8K resolution.

== Background ==
NHK Science & Technology Research Laboratories had started to develop an 8K broadcast resolution in 1995. The format was first publicly displayed at the Expo 2005 in Aichi Prefecture, Japan, whereas the first 8K live feed broadcast were tested at the 2012 Summer Olympics in London. Due to the successful tests, plans for a television channel dedicated to airing an 8K resolution were approved by the NHK.

On 1 August 2016, NHK started to test an Ultra HD channel on BS17, to prevent terrestrial digital broadcasting on its other networks. It featured a variety of 4K and 8K resolution programming, before concluding on 23 July 2018, after which an 8K network was assigned to a newly created BS 14 channel.

== Overview ==
NHK BS8K was launched on 1 December 2018 at 10:00 (JST) as the world's first television channel to broadcast in to 8K "Super Hi-Vision", along with NHK BS4K, which broadcasts in a similar but lower 2160p 4K UHD TV resolution. Unlike its preceding formats, BS8K's 4320p resolution is displayed through a progressive scan standard, as opposed to the traditional 1080i HDTV that is commonly used by broadcasting systems around the world, including NHK's General TV service. The technology used to broadcast the resolution was developed by the NHK Science & Technology Research Laboratories, which had earlier developed the High Efficiency Video Coding format to be used for the 8K resolution in 2013. The channel's audio is broadcast in a 22.2 surround sound standard.

=== Promotion ===
To promote the launch of BS8K, NHK opened a "Super Hi-Vision Park" at an event hall in Shibuya, Tokyo from 30 November 2018 to 4 December 2018, featuring an "8K Living Room" equipped with an UHD TV and a 22-multichannel home theatre system. On 1 December 2018, the NHK Science & Technology Research Laboratories also demonstrated a public viewing of both the BS8K and the BS4K channels, which included a live feed of the Roman Forum and the Pantheon in Rome, Italy, and a presentation of the remastered version of the feature film 2001: A Space Odyssey (1968).

== Programming ==
NHK BS8K broadcasts for twelve hours a day, unlike its sister channel BS4K, which broadcasts for 18 hours a day. BS8K broadcasts entertainment, art, documentary and sporting events. Some of the programs being broadcast include footage shot in 8K from Antarctica and the International Space Station, the annual Kōhaku Uta Gassen, and recorded concerts from some of the world's leading orchestras to showcase the immersive 22.2 channel sound. Wife of a Spy, the first television drama to be originally broadcast on Ultra HD, premiered on the channel on 6 June 2020. NHK also broadcast over 200 hours of the 2020 Summer Olympics in 8K resolution on the BS8K channel.
