= CCTV-9 News =

CCTV-9 News or simply as CCTV News is the main newscast on Chinese International English language news and information channel, CCTV-9, which became CCTV NEWS in 2010. It covers the news stories from China, Asia and around the world in 30 minutes. The 30 minutes edition broadcast daily at 09.00 UTC (17.00 Beijing and Singapore Time or 16.00 Bangkok and Hanoi Time) and in 16.00 UTC (00.00 Beijing and Singapore time or 23.00 Bangkok and Jakarta time). 15 minutes news update is available at 01.00, 02.00, 07.00 and 08.00 UTC (09.00, 10.00, 15.00 and 16.00 Beijing and Singapore time or 08.00, 09.00, 14.00 and 15.00 Bangkok and Jakarta time.

== News hosts ==
- Edwin Maher
- James Chau
- Liu Xin
- Vimbayi Kajese
