= NHK Educational TV =

Japanese educational television channel

- Logo used since 2020
- Country: Japan
- Broadcast area: Nationwide
- Headquarters: NHK Broadcasting Center, Shibuya, Tokyo, Japan

Programming
- Language: Japanese (English/original language available for select programs on secondary audio carrier)
- Picture format: 1080i HDTV (downscaled to letterboxed 480i for the SDTV feed)

Ownership
- Owner: NHK
- Sister channels: General; BS; BS Premium 4K; BS8K

History
- Launched: January 10, 1959; 67 years ago

Links
- Website: NHK Plus (only available in Japan)

Availability

Terrestrial
- Digital terrestrial (ISDB): Channel 2

NHK Educational TV (NHK教育テレビジョン, Enu eichi kei Kyōiku terebijon), abbreviated on-screen as NHK E, is the second television service of NHK (Japan Broadcasting Corporation). It is a sister service of NHK General TV, showing programs of a more educational, documentaries, cultural, children's or intellectual nature, periodically also showing anime, and also airing programming from Nickelodeon. A similar counterpart would be PBS of the United States (or to a lesser extent BBC Two, BBC Three, BBC Four, CBBC and CBeebies of the UK). NHK displays a watermark "NHK E" at the upper right for its digital TV broadcast. In 2010, NHK began using the abbreviation E Tele (イーテレ, Ī Tere).

== Overview ==
Unlike NHK General Television (NHK G), which organizes programs differently for each region, it is based on a unified programming organization throughout Japan, so in the Kanto region, the three Tokai prefectures, and Kinki region, some prefectures broadcast. It is set as a broadcasting area equivalent to the wide area broadcasting of commercial broadcasting without setting. As a result, the number of broadcasting stations that can broadcast independently is 41, which is less than that of NHK General TV.

The structure is generally based on various educational programming, hobbies/liberal arts courses, welfare/entertainment for the disabled, and entertainment for children, but high school baseball is also broadcast. Some of them were once broadcast on NHK General TV, but they have been consolidated due to changes in media.

Since the 2000s, NHK E has been lined up with popular programs that have been softened by renewing individual programs and appointing talents while following the past program structure. For example, "Go/Shogi", "Persons with disabilities", "Classical music", "Language", "Tanka/Haiku", etc. are not only treated purely, but are also made as "cultural programs close to variety shows". The editing of the program also makes heavy use of telops and wipes, and is close to that of commercial broadcasting.

In "Today's Menu", language courses and hobby programs, the promotion of the program text is always inserted at the end of the program. The theme of "Sunday Art Museum" is that special exhibitions are held at museums in Japan, and artists and genres that are timely for industrial use, such as "XX Anniversary", are given priority.

There used to be a 24-hour broadcast, but due to various reasons, it was canceled and the average daily broadcast is around 21 hours. However, with the completion of the digitization principle, efforts are being made to reduce this by utilizing multi-organization, etc., and from 2012, the broadcasting time will be further reduced.

== History ==
The Tokyo station was opened on January 10, 1959 as Japan's first television broadcasting station specializing in educational broadcasting, and the Osaka station was opened on April 1, 1959. Initially, it didn't broadcast all day, being interrupted for several hours during the day and test patterns were played.

Tokyo opened on channel 1 from Tokyo Tower, which was just completed, and on April 6 of the same year, the general and educational channels that were broadcast on channel 3 from the transmission station in Chiyoda Ward (later Chiyoda Broadcasting Center) were replaced. Until then, channel 12 assigned for US military radar was used in Osaka. Even nationwide, there were relatively many areas where 12ch was assigned to analog broadcasting on educational television. Until Educational TV was made available nationwide, some programs for the schools were broadcast on NHK General TV in areas where only NHK General TV broadcast.

Color broadcasting began around the same time as NHK General TV. According to the NHK Archives program guide search, there is a description in the program "Kacchan" for young children on September 10, 1960, when the main broadcast started, and after September 12, the programs "Science Class", "First grade of elementary school" and "I made it" for young children are broadcast in color in Tokyo. On October 5, 1959, Okaasan to Issho's broadcast started. Okaasan to Issho broadcast as a children program to all places broadcasting NHK Educational TV. Most NHK-E stations converted to color on March 20, 1966. Okinawa started receiving the network in 1972, with the conversion of OHK into an NHK unit following the reversion agreement.

Due to the influence of the first oil crisis, after January 16, 1974, 1 to 3 hours between 14:30 to 17:30 were used for an interruption, and the midnight broadcast was interrupted, pushing the closing time to 11pm. In 1975, the analog UHF experimental stations in Tokyo and Osaka were closed, and the experimental program "University Course" for the opening of the Open University of Japan will be broadcast. Therefore, the time saving measures due to the oil crisis were completely lifted for the first time in one year, two and a half months.

While the start of colorization of the broadcast itself was around the same time as the NHK General, full-scale colorization of the program wasn't complete even after the consolidation of bases in Tokyo to the broadcasting center in Shibuya was completed in October 1977. Due to this colorization, black-and-white broadcasting excluding reruns of past works has disappeared from Japanese TV programs.

Regarding analog sound multiplex broadcasting, it was first implemented in the three major metropolitan areas from October 1990, and the others from March 21 the following year. Both were considerably slower than NHK General TV and commercial broadcasters in Tokyo and Osaka. Teletext broadcasting (subtitled broadcasting) started later in 1999.

However, with the launch of these services, the restrictions on the organization of educational television gradually decreased. As if to match this movement, some of the genres that had been broadcast comprehensively until then have been transferred to educational television as part of the genre organization, coupled with the start of the main broadcast of satellite television. The children's programs that were broadcast comprehensively disappeared in the Heisei era and were concentrated on educational television. News and information programs began to be organized during the general vacant time slots.

On October 6, 2025, all NHK E stations outside of Tokyo ceased local origination and became full-time translators under the Tokyo station(JOAB-DTV). Despite this, the callsigns are still reserved for legal identifications.

== Programs ==
Some of the programs on NHK E are as follows:

- Okaasan to Issho (おかあさんといっしょ) (1985-on air). After, Okaasan to Issho as NHK General TV is broadcast started on October 5, 1959, and 1984
- Onishi Hiroto's Basic English Recipe (大西泰斗の英会話☆定番レシピ) (2021-)
- Numbers and Figures (数とかたち) (1977–1984)
- The World of Mathematics (数の世界) (1980–1985)
- Fun with Math (たのしい算数) (1992–1995)
- One, Two, Three, Mathematics (いち、 に、 さん, 数の) (TBA)

== NHK domestic stations and Radio 2 / ETV services ==
NHK E is the only network in Japan to have the same channel number nationwide.

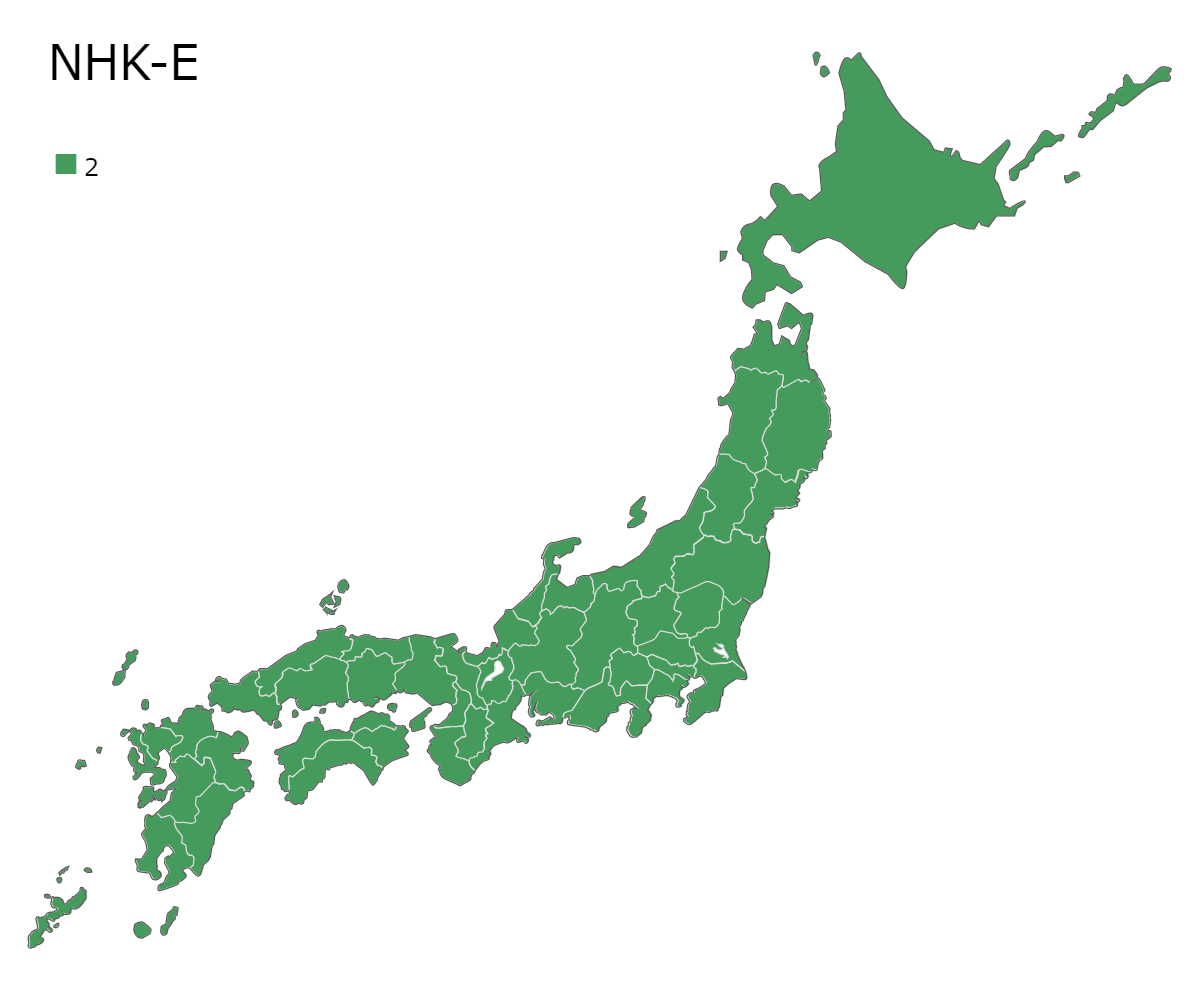
Channel designation for NHK Educational.

Region	Station	Radio 2	Educational TV (analog; closed)		Educational TV (digital)	Prefecture
Region	Station	Call sign		Ch.	Call sign	Prefecture
Hokkaidō	Sapporo	JOIB	JOIB-TV	12	JOIB-DTV	Ishikari, Shiribeshi and Sorachi Subprefectures
Hokkaidō	Hakodate	JOVB	JOVB-TV	10	JOVB-DTV	Oshima and Hiyama Subprefectures
Hokkaidō	Asahikawa	JOCC	JOCC-TV	2	JOCC-DTV	Kamikawa, Rumoi and Sōya Subprefectures
Hokkaidō	Obihiro	JOOC	JOOC-TV	12	JOOC-DTV	Tokachi Subprefecture
Hokkaidō	Kushiro	JOPC	JOPC-TV	2	JOPC-DTV	Kushiro and Nemuro Subprefectures
Hokkaidō	Kitami	JOKD	JOKD-TV	12	JOKD-DTV	Abashiri Subprefecture
Hokkaidō	Muroran	JOIZ	JOIZ-TV	2	JOIZ-DTV	Iburi and Hidaka Subprefectures
Tōhoku	Aomori	JOTC	JOTC-TV	5	JOTC-DTV	Aomori
Tōhoku	Akita	JOUB	JOUB-TV	2	JOUB-DTV	Akita
Tōhoku	Yamagata	JOJC	JOJC-TV	4	JOJC-DTV	Yamagata
Tōhoku	Morioka	JOQC	JOQC-TV	8	JOQC-DTV	Iwate
Tōhoku	Sendai	JOHB	JOHB-TV	5	JOHB-DTV	Miyagi
Tōhoku	Fukushima	JOFD	JOFD-TV	2	JOFD-DTV	Fukushima
Kantō･Kōshin'etsu	Tokyo	JOAB	JOAB-TV (Tokyo)	3	JOAB-DTV (Tokyo)	Tokyo
Kantō･Kōshin'etsu	Yokohama	--	JOAB-TV (Tokyo)	3	JOAB-DTV (Tokyo)	Kanagawa
Kantō･Kōshin'etsu	Chiba	--	JOAB-TV (Tokyo)	3	JOAB-DTV (Tokyo)	Chiba
Kantō･Kōshin'etsu	Saitama	--	JOAB-TV (Tokyo)	3	JOAB-DTV (Tokyo)	Saitama
Kantō･Kōshin'etsu	Maebashi	--	JOAB-TV (Tokyo)	3	JOAB-DTV (Tokyo)	Gunma
Kantō･Kōshin'etsu	Utsunomiya	--	JOAB-TV (Tokyo)	3	JOAB-DTV (Tokyo)	Tochigi
Kantō･Kōshin'etsu	Mito	--	JOAB-TV (Tokyo)	3	JOAB-DTV (Tokyo)	Ibaraki
Kantō･Kōshin'etsu	Kōfu	JOKC	JOKC-TV	3	JOKC-DTV	Yamanashi
Kantō･Kōshin'etsu	Nagano	JONB	JONB-TV	9	JONB-DTV	Nagano
Kantō･Kōshin'etsu	Niigata	JOQB	JOQB-TV	12	JOQB-DTV	Niigata
Tōkai･Hokuriku	Toyama	JOIC	JOIC-TV	10	JOIC-DTV	Toyama
Tōkai･Hokuriku	Kanazawa	JOJB	JOJB-TV	8	JOJB-DTV	Ishikawa
Tōkai･Hokuriku	Fukui	JOFC	JOFC-TV	3	JOFC-DTV	Fukui
Tōkai･Hokuriku	Shizuoka	JOPB	JOPB-TV	2	JOPB-DTV	Shizuoka
Tōkai･Hokuriku	Nagoya	JOCB	JOCB-TV (Nagoya)	9	JOCB-DTV (Nagoya)	Aichi
Tōkai･Hokuriku	Gifu	--	JOCB-TV (Nagoya)	9	JOCB-DTV (Nagoya)	Gifu
Tōkai･Hokuriku	Tsu	--	JOCB-TV (Nagoya)	9	JOCB-DTV (Nagoya)	Mie
Kansai	Osaka	JOBB	JOBB-TV (Osaka)	12	JOBB-DTV (Osaka)	Osaka
Kansai	Kōbe	--	JOBB-TV (Osaka)	12	JOBB-DTV (Osaka)	Hyōgo
Kansai	Kyōto	--	JOBB-TV (Osaka)	12	JOBB-DTV (Osaka)	Kyōto
Kansai	Ōtsu	--	JOBB-TV (Osaka)	12	JOBB-DTV (Osaka)	Shiga
Kansai	Nara	--	JOBB-TV (Osaka)	12	JOBB-DTV (Osaka)	Nara
Kansai	Wakayama	--	JOBB-TV (Osaka)	12	JOBB-DTV (Osaka)	Wakayama
Chūgoku	Tottori	JOLC	JOLC-TV	4	JOLC-DTV	Tottori
Chūgoku	Matsue	JOTB	JOTB-TV	12	JOTB-DTV	Shimane
Chūgoku	Okayama	JOKB	JOKB-TV	3	JOKB-DTV	Okayama
Chūgoku	Hiroshima	JOFB	JOFB-TV	7	JOFB-DTV	Hiroshima
Chūgoku	Yamaguchi	JOUC	JOUC-TV	1	JOUC-DTV	Yamaguchi
Shikoku	Tokushima	--	JOXB-TV	38	JOXB-DTV	Tokushima
Shikoku	Takamatsu	JOHD	JOHD-TV	39	JOHD-DTV	Kagawa
Shikoku	Matsuyama	JOZB	JOZB-TV	2	JOZB-DTV	Ehime
Shikoku	Kōchi	JORB	JORB-TV	6	JORB-DTV	Kōchi
Kyūshū-Okinawa	Fukuoka	JOLB	JOLB-TV	6	JOLB-DTV	Fukuoka (Western)
Kyūshū-Okinawa	Kitakyūshū	JOSB	JOSB-TV	12	JOSB-DTV	Fukuoka (Eastern)/Yamaguchi (Shimonoseki)
Kyūshū-Okinawa	Saga	--	JOSD-TV	40	JOSD-DTV	Saga
Kyūshū-Okinawa	Nagasaki	JOAC	JOAC-TV	1	JOAC-DTV	Nagasaki
Kyūshū-Okinawa	Kumamoto	JOGB	JOGB-TV	2	JOGB-DTV	Kumamoto
Kyūshū-Okinawa	Ōita	JOID	JOID-TV	12	JOID-DTV	Ōita
Kyūshū-Okinawa	Miyazaki	JOMC	JOMC-TV	12	JOMC-DTV	Miyazaki
Kyūshū-Okinawa	Kagoshima	JOHC	JOHC-TV	5	JOHC-DTV	Kagoshima
Kyūshū-Okinawa	Naha	JOAD	JOAD-TV	12	JOAD-DTV	Okinawa
