= NHK BSP4K =

4K television channel owned by NHK

- Type: Free-to-air satellite
- Country: Japan
- Broadcast area: Nationwide
- Headquarters: NHK Broadcasting Center, Shibuya, Tokyo, Japan

Programming
- Language: Japanese
- Picture format: 2160p UHD TV

Ownership
- Owner: NHK
- Sister channels: NHK General TV; NHK Educational TV; NHK BS; NHK BS8K

History
- Launched: 1 December 2023

NHK BSP4K (NHK BS Premium 4K) is a 4K satellite television broadcasting service offered by NHK. The channel was created from the merger of NHK BS Premium and NHK BS4K.

== Background ==
On October 11, 2022, NHK announced a revised plan for the reorganization of satellite broadcasting, announcing that BS Premium, which had been broadcast since April 1, 2011, would be discontinued by the end of March 2024, and channel reorganization would be implemented on December 1, 2023, in advance of said change. At that time, two tentative names were presented: "New BS2K" based on BS1, and "New BS4K" which was integrated with BS Premium and BS4K, which has been broadcast since December 1, 2018.

On April 19, 2023, the reorganized channel line-up was officially announced, the result being that BS Premium and BS4K were to be merged. The chosen name for the channel was NHK BS Premium, and BS Premium’s purple colour was retained for the new channel.

2K format BS Premium officially closed on March 31, 2024, but in advance of that, the commercial broadcast of regular programs ended at midnight on November 30, 2023.

The official transition to 24-hour broadcasting will be from 4:00 p.m. on December 1, 2023 (suspended from 2:03 to 4:00 p.m.) due to the EPG's organization.

The schedule on Sundays and between Monday to Thursday will follow the BS Premium (2K broadcast) and BS4K programming of April 2023, and on Fridays and Saturdays, a different lineup will be broadcast, and will feature live broadcasts of large-scale special programs and 4K remasters of past content.
