= Terunobu Maeda =

Japanese investor (born 1945)

- Born: January 2, 1945 (age 81); Kumamoto, Japan
- Education: University of Tokyo
- Occupation: Investor

Terunobu Maeda (前田 晃伸, Maeda Terunobu; born January 2, 1945) is a Japanese investor who has been the president and CEO of Mizuho Financial Group (2002–2009), chairman of the Japanese Bankers Association (2005–2006) and the president of NHK (2020–2023).

== Early life ==
Maeda was born in Kumamoto, raised in Nakatsu, Ōita and graduated from the University of Tokyo with a degree in law.

== Business career ==
Maeda joined Fuji Bank in 1968. He became vice-president of Fuji Bank, the predecessor of the present Mizuho Financial Group, in 1999. The bank recorded a loss of 2.38 trillion JPY that fiscal year as it wrote off non-performing loans accrued during three recessions in a decade. Maeda returned it to profitability the next year after reducing bad assets and through gains on investments in Japanese stocks.

Maeda was named "Top chief executive officer" in Japanese banking sector in 2007, according to Institutional Investor magazine.

== Personal life ==
Maeda is an amateur gardener who does not use air conditioners at his home during Tokyo's humid summers to make an environmental point.
