= NHK BS =

Japanese satellite television channel

- Type: Free-to-air satellite
- Country: Japan
- Broadcast area: Nationwide
- Headquarters: NHK Broadcasting Center, Shibuya, Tokyo, Japan

Programming
- Language: Japanese
- Picture format: HDTV 1080i (downscaled to letterboxed 480i for the SD feed)

Ownership
- Owner: NHK
- Sister channels: NHK General TV; NHK Educational TV; NHK BS Premium 4K; NHK BS8K

History
- Launched: 1 December 2023
- Replaced: NHK BS1

NHK BS is a satellite television broadcasting service offered by Japanese public broadcaster NHK. The channel was created in 2023.

== Restructuring ==
NHK was repeatedly asked by the Ministry of Internal Affairs and Communications to cut costs, and to take advantage of the high image quality of satellite broadcasting, NHK was also asked to reduce and organize the channels of its basic satellite broadcasting by image quality.

On October 11, 2022, NHK announced a plan for the reorganization. The company announced that channel reorganization would be implemented on December 1, 2023 and that BS Premium, which had been broadcast since April 1, 2011, would be discontinued by the end of March 2024. At that time, two tentative names were presented: "New BS2K", based on BS1; and "New BS4K" which was integrated with BS Premium and BS4K.

On April 19, 2023, less than eight months ahead of the reorganization, the reorganized channel line-up was officially announced. Since the channel would be broadcast in 2K image quality, it was named "NHK BS" as the "entry channel" (starter channel) for NHK's satellite broadcasting, with the hope that "when you think of NHK satellite broadcasting, you think of this!". The channel color inherited the blue color of BS1.

The Japanese government's policy is to progressively improve satellite television broadcasting quality. However, NHK BS' role as the main channel for NHK satellite broadcasting was transferred to NHK BS Premium 4K, relaunched on the same day, with programming selected from the previous two channels with 2K quality broadcasting. The resolution is 1440 x 1080 pixels. The bit rate is approximately 17.8Mbps.

Jun Matsumoto, who starred in the historical drama Dosuru Ieyasu in the year of the reorganization, was appointed as the main personality promoting the series of reorganizations.

== Programming ==
Genres include dramas, cultural programs, documentaries, travel programs, international information, sports etc., but most of the programs on BS1 and BS Premium before the reorganization remained. For example, world news in the morning, would be followed by past works of serial TV novels and new works, along with weekly recaps (uncut rebroadcasts of all five episodes) on Saturdays, advance looks at taiga dramas, and premium cinema or sumo wrestling.

=== Sports ===
Sports appear mainly on Saturdays and Sundays, and in at night on subchannels in order to give priority to the regular schedule. On weekdays, premium cinemas, documentaries, and travel programs may be suspended and broadcast. Starting in 2024, sports broadcasts such as J.League and professional baseball were broadcast in the morning on weekdays, and at night on Wednesdays to Saturdays. Overseas sports broadcasts other than US Major League Baseball were discontinued.

In order to give priority to sports broadcasts during the professional baseball season starting in April, broadcast slots will be set in the morning and Wednesday to Friday evenings, and BS Premium programs such as cultural and documentary programs were reduced.

=== Updates ===
NHK's programming revisions in the second half of the year are usually carried out between late September and early October, but for BS, like its predecessor BS1, it is carried out between late October and early November, one month later than other broadcast waves. This is due to the off-season of baseball (Japanese professional baseball and American MLB) and the end of daylight saving time in Europe and America.
