= Bay FM (Japan) =

Coordinates: 35°38′53″N 140°02′18″E

JOGV-FM
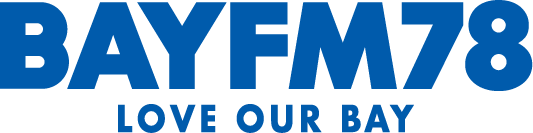
- Logo used since 2023
- Mihama-ku, Chiba; Japan
- Broadcast area: Chiba Prefecture
- Frequency: 78.0 MHz
- Branding: Bay FM 78

Programming
- Language: Japanese
- Format: Full Service, J-Pop
- Affiliations: independent

Ownership
- Owner: bayfm78 Company Limited

History
- First air date: October 1, 1989
- Former names: FM Sound Chiba

Technical information
- Licensing authority: MIC
- Power: 5,000 Watts (Chiba)
- ERP: 23,000 Watts (Chiba)
- Translators: 87.4 MHz (Katsuura); 79.3 MHz (Choshi); 79.7 MHz (Shirahama); 77.7 MHz (Tateyama)

Links
- Webcast: Bay FM Webcast
- Website: https://www.bayfm.co.jp/

JOGV-FM, branded as bayfm (ベイエフエム, Bei Efu Emu), is a Japanese radio station based in Chiba City, Chiba, Japan with its main frequency at 78.0 MHz. It also broadcasts on 87.4 MHz in Katsuura, 79.3 MHz in Choshi, 79.7 MHz in Shirahama & 77.7 MHz in Tateyama.

== Rebroadcasters ==
Rebroadcasters of JOGV-FM
City of licence	Identifier	Frequency	Power
Chiba City	N/A	78.0 MHz	5,000 watts
Katsuura	N/A	87.4 MHz	watts
Choshi	N/A	79.3 MHz	watts
Shirahama	N/A	79.7 MHz	watts
Tateyama	N/A	77.7 MHz	watts
