= Liu Xin (news anchor) =

Chinese news anchor

- 刘欣
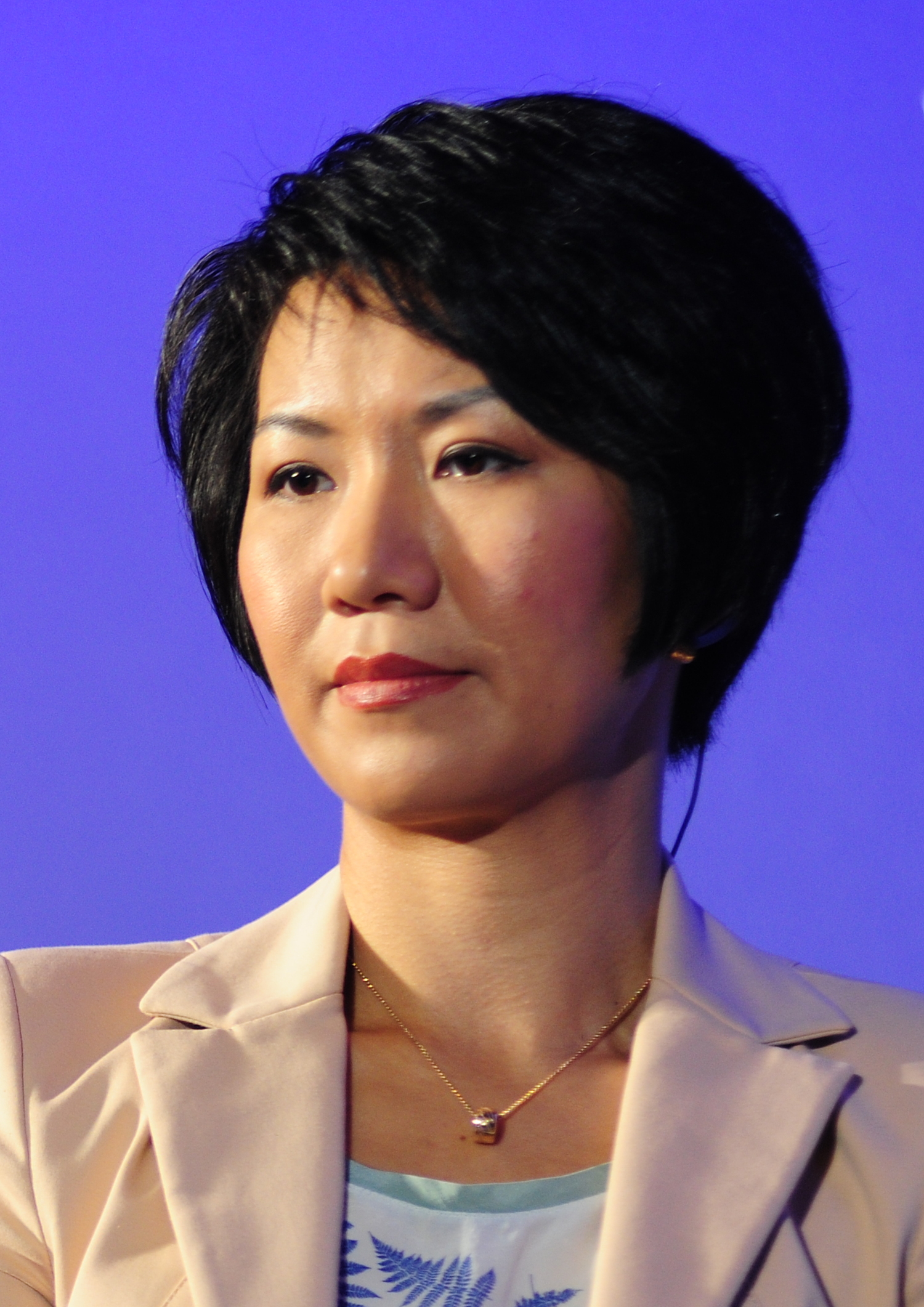
- Liu Xin at WTO Public Forum 2016
- Born: 10 November 1975 (age 50); Zhenjiang, Jiangsu, China
- Education: English language and literature B.A.
- Alma mater: Nanjing University
- Notable work: The Point with Liu Xin (2017-)
- Children: 2

Liu Xin (simplified Chinese: 刘欣; traditional Chinese: 劉欣; pinyin: Liú Xīn; born 10 November 1975) is a host and journalist for the English-language Chinese government-broadcaster China Global Television Network (CGTN), now hosting the opinion show named The Point with Liu Xin on weekdays at CGTN. She is fluent in Mandarin, English and French, and conversational in German and Turkish.

== Biography ==
Liu was born in Zhenjiang, Jiangsu, China. She attended Nanjing University, one of the top universities in China, between 1993 and 1997. She majored in English language and literature. In 1996, Liu became the first Chinese student to participate in and win the International Public Speaking Competition in London. After graduating from college, she joined CCTV and later became an anchorwoman on CCTV's English language channel. In 2011, she was posted to Geneva, where she served as the Geneva Bureau Chief of CCTV, for nearly six years.

Since the foundation of CGTN in 2016, she returned to China and began the opinion program The Point with Liu Xin in 2017.

In 2019, she criticized Fox News host Trish Regan's coverage of the US-China Trade Conflict as “all emotion” and “little substance.” Subsequently, Regan invited Liu to a debate on her program. An article on Reuters published prior to the debate said that "China’s war of words with the United States over their escalating trade dispute will reach a crescendo of sorts" with the exchange. The debate garnered a lot of attention in China, with posts about the debate receiving 260 million views and more than 53,000 comments on micro-blogging site Sina Weibo. The debate was later described as "polite, dull and condescending" in a media account.

== Personal life ==
Liu is married to a German citizen of Turkish descent. They have two children.
