= NHK =

Japanese public broadcaster

Japan Broadcasting Corporation
- Logo used since 2020

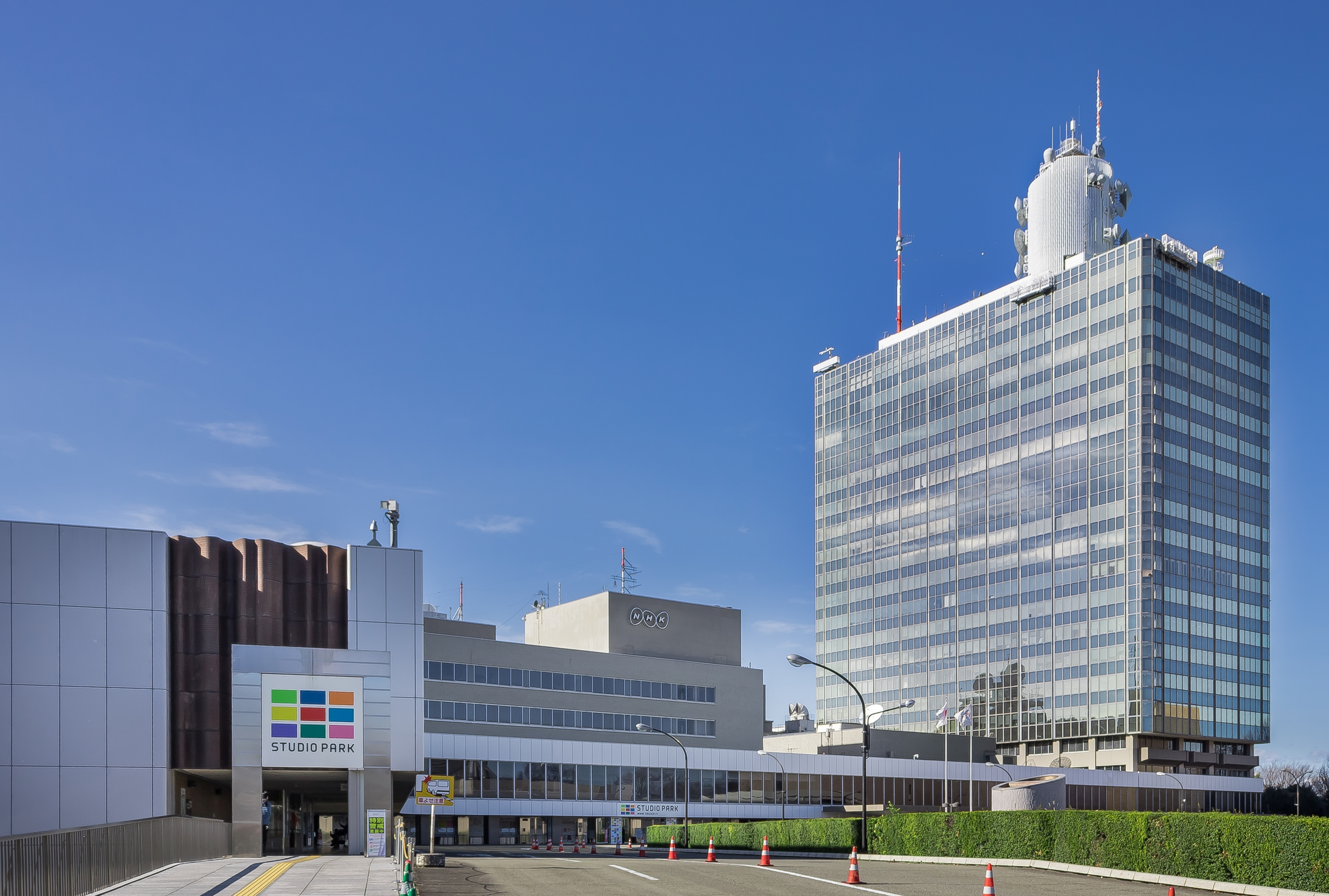
- Headquarters at the NHK Broadcasting Center in Shibuya, Tokyo
- Trade name: NHK
- Native name: 日本放送協会
- Romanized name: Nippon Hōsō Kyōkai
- Formerly: Tokyo/Osaka/Nagoya Broadcasting Station (1925–1926); Broadcasting Corporation of Japan (English name 1926–1950)
- Type: Statutory corporation chartered under the Broadcasting Act of 1950
- Industry: Broadcast radio, television and online
- Predecessor: Tokyo Broadcasting Station
- Founded: 6 August 1926; 100 years ago (original incarnation and brand); 1 June 1950; 76 years ago (current incarnation)
- Founder: Gotō Shinpei
- Headquarters: NHK Broadcasting Center, Jinnan, Shibuya, Tokyo, Japan
- Area served: Japan; Worldwide (NHK World-Japan)
- Key people: Nobuyuki Koga (chairman); Tatsuhiko Inoue (president); Hideo Koike (executive vice president)
- Number of employees: 10,333 (2019)
- Subsidiaries: NHK Media Holdings; Japan International Broadcasting; NHK Publishing; NHK Technologies; NHK Culture Center
- Website: nhk.or.jp

The Japan Broadcasting Corporation (Japanese: 日本放送協会, Hepburn: Nippon Hōsō Kyōkai), also known by its romanized initialism NHK, (Note: Pronounced in Japanese as Enueichikē (エヌエイチケイ)) is a Japanese public broadcaster. It is a statutory corporation funded by viewers' payments of a television license fee.

NHK operates two terrestrial television channels (NHK General TV and NHK Educational TV), three satellite television channels (NHK BS; as well as two ultra-high-definition television channels, NHK BS Premium 4K and NHK BS8K), and two radio networks (NHK AM and NHK FM).

NHK also provides an international broadcasting service, known as NHK World-Japan, which is composed of NHK World TV, NHK World Premium, and the shortwave radio service Radio Japan (RJ). World Radio Japan also makes some of its programs available on the Internet.

NHK was the first broadcaster in the world to broadcast in high-definition (using multiple sub-Nyquist sampling encoding, also known as Hi-Vision) and in 8K.

== History ==
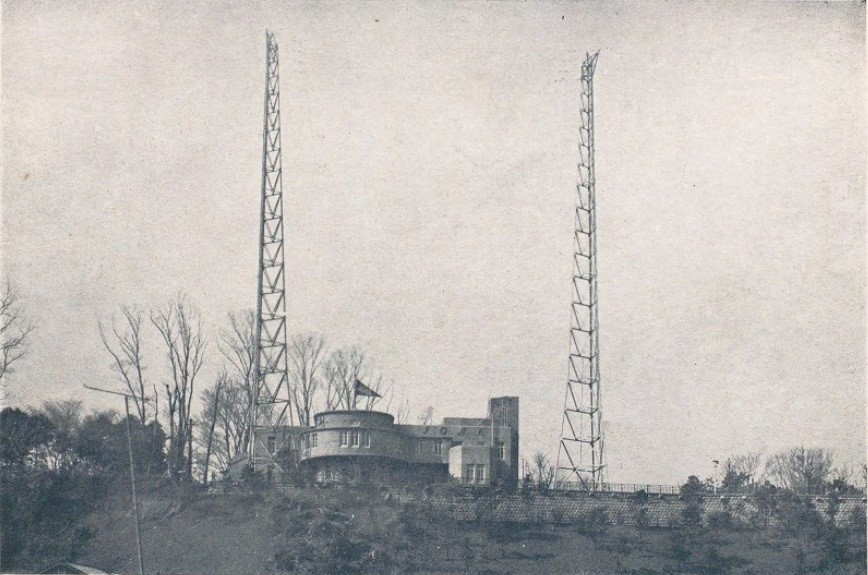
Atagoyama Broadcasting Station, the birthplace of NHK, in 1930

NHK's earliest forerunner was the Tokyo Broadcasting Station (東京放送局), founded in 1924 under the leadership of Count Gotō Shinpei. Tokyo Broadcasting Station, along with separate organizations in Osaka and Nagoya, began radio broadcasts in 1925. The three stations merged under the first incarnation of NHK in August 1926. NHK was modeled on the BBC of the United Kingdom, and the merger and reorganisation was carried out under the auspices of the pre-war Ministry of Communications. NHK's second radio network began in 1931, and the third radio network began airing in FM in 1957.

=== Radio broadcasting ===
NHK began shortwave broadcasting on an experimental basis in the 1930s, and began regular English and Japanese-language broadcasts in 1935 under the name Radio Japan, initially aimed at ethnic Japanese listeners in Hawaii and the west coast of North America. By the late 1930s, NHK's overseas broadcasts were known as Radio Tokyo, which became its official name in 1941.

In November 1941, the Imperial Japanese Army nationalised all public news agencies and coordinated their efforts via the Information Liaison Confidential Committee. All published and broadcast news reports became official announcements of the Imperial Army General Headquarters in Tokyo for the duration of World War II. NHK broadcast the famous Tokyo Rose wartime programs, as well as the surrender speech made by Emperor Hirohito, in August 1945, known as Gyokuon-hōsō.

Following the war, in September 1945, the Allied Occupation Administration under General Douglas MacArthur banned all international broadcasting by NHK, and repurposed several NHK facilities and frequencies for use by the Far East Network (now American Forces Network). Japanese-American radio broadcaster Frank Shozo Baba joined NHK during this time and led an early post-war revamp of its programming. Radio Japan resumed overseas broadcasts in 1952.

A new Broadcasting Act was enacted in 1950, which made NHK a listener-supported independent corporation and simultaneously opened the market for commercial broadcasting in Japan. NHK began television broadcasting in 1953, followed by its educational TV channel in 1959, and color television broadcasts in 1960.

NHK opened the first stage of its current headquarters in Japan's capital city's special ward Shibuya as an international broadcasting center for the 1964 Summer Olympics, the first widely televised Olympic Games. The complex was gradually expanded through 1973 when it became the headquarters for NHK. The previous headquarters adjacent to Hibiya Park were redeveloped as the Hibiya City high-rise complex.

=== Satellite broadcasting ===
NHK began experimental satellite broadcasting with the NHK BS 1 channel in 1984, followed by NHK BS 2 in 1985, with both beginning regular broadcasts in 1989. In April 2011, BS 1 was rebranded, while BS 2 ceased broadcasting and was replaced by "BS Premium" which operates on a channel formerly occupied by BShi.

International satellite broadcasts to North America and Europe began in 1995, which led to the launch of NHK World in 1998. It became free-to-air over the Astra 19.2°E (Astra 1L) and Eurobird satellites in Europe in 2008.

=== Digital television ===
NHK began digital television broadcasting in December 2000 through BS Digital, followed by terrestrial digital TV broadcasts in three major metropolitan areas in 2003. NHK's digital television coverage gradually expanded to cover almost all of Japan by 24 July 2011, when analog transmissions were discontinued & ended (except in three prefectures that were heavily affected by the 2011 Tōhoku earthquake and tsunami – Iwate, Miyagi, Fukushima – where it continued until 31 March 2012).

=== Studies of Broadcasting ===
Studies of Broadcasting
- Discipline: Broadcasting science
- Language: English

Publication details
- History: 1963–1999

Standard abbreviations
- ISO 4: Stud. Broadcast.

Indexing
- ISSN: 0585-7325
- OCLC no.: 474034025

From 1963 to 1999, NHK published the journal Studies of broadcasting: an international annual of broadcasting science.

== Organization ==
NHK is a dependent corporation chartered by the Japanese Broadcasting Act and primarily funded by license fees. NHK World broadcasting (for overseas viewers/listeners) is funded by the Japanese government. The annual budget of NHK is subject to review and approval by the Diet of Japan, which also appoints the twelve-member board of governors (経営委員会, keiei iinkai) that oversees NHK.

NHK is managed on a full-time basis by an executive board (理事会, rijikai) consisting of a president, executive vice president and seven to ten managing directors who oversee various areas of operations. The executive board reports to the board of governors.

=== Subsidiaries ===
- NHK Enterprises, Inc. (NHKエンタープライズ, abbreviated NEP): Established on 1 April 2005.
- NHK Educational Corporation (株式会社 NHKエデュケーショナル): Established on 30 May 1989.
- NHK ART, Inc. (株式会社NHKアート): Established on 10 July 1961.
- NHK Publishing, Inc. (NHK出版): Established on 1 April 1931.
- Japan International Broadcasting Inc. (株式会社日本国際放送)/JIB: Established on 4 April 2008.
- NHK International, Inc. (一般財団法人NHKインターナショナル): Established on 1 July 1980.
- NHK Global Media Services, Inc. (株式会社NHKグローバルメディアサービス): Established on 1 April 2009, by merging NHK Joho Network, Inc. ((株)NHK情報ネットワーク) (established on 1 January 1989) and Japan Teletex Co. Ltd. (日本文字放送) (established in 1985).
- NHK Cosmomedia America, Inc.: Created by merging Japan Network Group (Media International Corporation) and NHK Enterprises America, Inc. on 1 April 2010, but its licence was granted on 12 November 2008. The company's logo was filed on 23 March 2010 and registered on 13 December 2011.
- NHK Cosmomedia (Europe) Limited: Created by merging JSTV (company founded on 8 November 1989) and NHK Enterprises Europe in April 2010.
- NHK Technologies, Inc. (株式会社NHKテクノロジーズ): Established on 1 April 2019, by merging NHK Integrated Technology Inc. (株式会社NHKアイテック) and NHK Media Technology, Inc. (株式会社NHKメディアテクノロジー).
- Broadcasting Satellite System Corporation (株式会社 放送衛星システム)/B-SAT: Established on 13 April 1993.
- NHK Engineering System, Inc. (一般財団法人NHKエンジニアリングシステム): Established on 22 December 1981.
- NHK GAKUEN (学校法人 NHK学園): Established in 1962-10-01 (学校法人日本放送協会学園). It was renamed to its current name on 1 April 2018.
- NHK Symphony Orchestra, Tokyo (公益財団法人 NHK交響楽団): Established on 27 April 1942, as Japan Symphony Orchestra (財団法人日本交響楽団). On 1 August 1951, it was renamed to NHK Symphony Orchestra (財団法人NHK交響楽団). It became a public interest-incorporated foundation and was renamed to its current name on 1 April 2010.
- NHK Public Welfare Organization/NHK HEARTS (社会福祉法人NHK厚生文化事業団): Established on 31 August 1960.
- NHK Promotions Inc. (株式会社NHKプロモーション)/(株式会社エヌエイチケイプロモーション): Established on 1 October 1977, as NHK Promote Service Inc. (株式会社NHKプロモートサービス). It was renamed to its current name in October 1989.
- NHK CULTURE CENTER (株式会社エヌエイチケイ文化センター)/(NHKカルチャー): Established on 1 December 1978.
- NHK SERVICE CENTER, INC. (一般財団法人 NHK サービスセンター): Established on 28 February 1951.
- NHK BUSINESS SERVICES INC. (NHK営業サービス株式会社): Established on 17 January 1990.
- BS Conditional Access Systems Co., Ltd. (株式会社 ビーエス・コンディショナルアクセスシステムズ)/B-CAS (ビーキャス): Established on 22 February 2000.
- NHK Business Create Inc. (株式会社 NHKビジネスクリエイト): Established on 1 April 2009, by merger (株式会社NHKオフィス企画), (株式会社NHK共同サービス).
- NHK-Communications Training Institute (一般財団法人NHK放送研修センター): Established on 8 August 1985.

==== Former subsidiaries ====
- NHK Integrated Technology Inc. (株式会社NHKアイテック): Established on 23 July 1969, as NHK Integrated Technology Inc. (全日本テレビサービス株式会社). It was merged into NHK Technologies, Inc. on 1 April 2019.
- NHK Media Technology, Inc. (株式会社NHKメディアテクノロジー): Established in April 2008 by merging NHK Technical Service (株式会社NHKテクニカルサービス) (established 9 October 1984) and NHK Computer Service (株式会社NHKコンピューターサービス). It was merged into NHK Technologies, Inc. on 1 April 2019.

== Services ==
=== Radio ===
It maintains two radio stations available nationwide:

- NHK AM (previously as NHK Radio 1 and NHK Radio 2) – Broadcasts 24 hours and delivers news, information, weather forecasts, drama, and entertainment programs. It began its operations on July 12, 1925 as the first radio station in Japan and relaunched on 30 March 2026 (merger with NHK Radio 2). Its content and structure is similar to that of the UK's BBC Radio 4.
- NHK FM – Organizes various music programs, but mainly classical music, with educational and liberal arts programs. Simultaneous broadcasting with AM counterpart is also conducted (24-hour broadcasting). It is comparable to the BBC's Radio 1, Radio 2, and Radio 3.

All two stations can be accessed through the internet, within the Japan's national borders.

=== Television ===
It manages two open signal channels through digital terrestrial television. Since Japan has a television network system, it schedules regional opt-out in each of its centers. However, the NHK brand is common for the whole country.

- NHK General TV (NHK-G) – Pioneer of television in Japan, it began its broadcasts on 1 February 1953. Its offer is general and public service.
- NHK Educational TV (NHK-E) – Educational and cultural channel, designed especially for children. It has been broadcasting since 10 January 1959.

All of them can also be tuned through the Internet, within the national territory. It also has one exclusive satellite channel, as well as two in ultra-high definition.

- NHK BS (previously as NHK BS 1 and NHK BS Premium) – Specialized in information, international documentaries, sports broadcasts, cultural and entertainment programming. It was founded on 12 May 1984. Renamed as NHK BS on 1 December 2023.
- NHK BS Premium 4K (previously as NHK BS Premium and NHK BS4K) – Cultural and entertainment programming in 4K. It was founded on 1 April 2011 and relaunched on 1 December 2023 (merger with NHK BS4K).
- NHK BS8K – 8K programming, launched on 1 December 2018.

== License fee ==
NHK is funded by reception fees (受信料, jushinryō), a system analogous to the license fee used in some English-speaking countries. The Broadcasting Act which governs NHK's funding stipulates anyone with equipment able to receive NHK must pay. The fee is standardized, with discounts for 6 and 12 monthly payments, as well a different fee rate for residents of Okinawa prefecture. For viewers making annual payments by credit card with no special discounts, the reception fee is 12,765 yen per year for terrestrial reception only, and 21,765 yen per year for both terrestrial and broadcast satellite reception.

However, the Broadcasting Act specifies no punitive actions for nonpayment; as a result, after a rash of NHK-related scandals including an accounting one, the number of people in 2006 who had not paid the license fee surpassed one million viewers. This incident sparked debate over the fairness of the fee system. That year, the NHK opted to take legal action against those most flagrantly in violation of the law. By fiscal year 2023, the amount of those refusing to pay had gone up to 1.66 million.

This fee and how it is charged is unpopular with some citizens. This led to the formation of the NHK Party (NHK党, NHK tō), also known as N-Koku (N国), a single-issue political party, which has protested this fee with representatives in the upper house.

In the 2025 fiscal year, NHK will have a projected shortfall of 40 billion yen in license fees. But the network seeks to fill the hole left by non-paying and no-television-watching watchers by collecting fees for a new streaming service planned to start at the beginning of the year. According to NHK, the new "internet-only" fee of 1,100 yen (US$7) a month, the same as the broadcast fee, could add around 100 million yen (US$634,000) to its yearly budget.

== TV programming ==
NHK broadcasts a variety of programming.

=== News ===
By the early 1970s, NHK had 24 foreign bureaus, the most of any TV network in the world. It offers local, national, and world news reports. NHK News 7 airs daily and is broadcast bilingually with both Japanese and English audio tracks on NHK General TV, NHK's international channels, TV Japan, and NHK World Premium. The flagship news program News Watch 9 is also bilingual and airs on NHK General TV, the international channels, and NHK World Premium. World News, a program which airs bulletins from international broadcasters interpreted in Japanese, is aired on NHK BS1 with Catch! Sekai no Top News in the morning and International News Report at night, with the latter also airing on NHK World Premium.

NHK also offers news for the deaf (which airs on NHK Educational TV), regional news (which airs on NHK General TV) and children's news. Newsline is an English-language newscast designed for foreign viewers and airs on NHK World.

In his book Broadcasting Politics in Japan: NHK and Television News, Ellis S. Krauss states: 'In the 1960s and 1970s, external critics of NHK news were complaining about the strict neutrality, the lack of criticism of the government, and the 'self-regulation in covering events'. Krauss claims that little had changed by the 1980s and 1990s. After the Fukushima nuclear disaster in 2011, NHK was criticised for underplaying the dangers from radioactive contamination.

=== Emergency reporting ===
Under the Broadcasting Act, NHK is under the obligation to broadcast early warning emergency reporting in times of natural disasters such as earthquakes and tsunamis. Their national network of seismometers, in cooperation with the Japan Meteorological Agency, makes NHK capable of delivering earthquake early warnings seconds after detection, as well as a more detailed report with Shindo intensity measurements within two-to-three minutes after the quake. They also broadcast air attack warnings in the event of war, using the J-Alert system.

All warnings are broadcast in Japanese, with tsunami warnings also delivered in four foreign languages: English, Mandarin Chinese, Korean and Portuguese (Japan has small Chinese, Korean and Brazilian populations). The warnings were broadcast in these languages during the 2011 Tōhoku earthquake and tsunami.

=== Sports ===
NHK broadcasts sumo wrestling, baseball games, Olympic Games, soccer matches, and a range of other sports. Their broadcast of the last two days of October 1952's autumn sumo tournament became the first ever televised sports broadcast in Japan.

=== Music ===
The NHK Symphony Orchestra, financially sponsored by NHK, was formerly (until 1951) the Japanese Symphony Orchestra. Its website details the orchestra's history and ongoing concert programmes. Since 1953, NHK has broadcast the Kōhaku Uta Gassen song contest on New Year's Eve, ending shortly before midnight in PIX System.

=== Drama ===
A daily serialized short morning drama known as Asadora, a weekly Japanese period drama or jidaigeki, and a year-long show, the Taiga drama, spearhead the network's fiction offerings.

NHK is also making efforts at broadcasting overseas drama (海外ドラマ, Kaigai Dorama).

=== Children ===
The longest running children's show in Japan, Okaasan to Issho (おかあさんといっしょ, With Mother), started broadcasting in 1959 and still airs to this day Monday to Friday from 17:36–18:00 JST, Sunday from 17:30–17:54 JST, with rebroadcasts Tuesday to Sunday from 5:00–5:24 JST on NHK World Premium.

== Criticisms and controversies ==
=== Insider trading ban ===
In 2007, three employees of NHK were fined and fired for insider trading. They had profited by trading shares based on exclusive NHK knowledge.

On 11 July 2008, NHK introduced a ban which prohibited its roughly 5,700 employees with access to its internal news information management system from trading stocks. The employees were required to pledge in writing that they would not trade stocks, and were required to gain approval from senior staff to sell shares they already held.

NHK banned short-term stock trading completed in periods of six months or less for all employees. The ban did not, however, extend to employees' families, nor did NHK request any reports on their transactions.

=== Overwork death ===
On 24 July 2013, Miwa Sado, a 31-year-old reporter at NHK Metropolitan Broadcasting Center died of congestive heart failure. In May 2014, the Shibuya Labor Standards Inspection Office of the Tokyo Labor Bureau certified it as a karōshi (overwork death). The information was made public in October 2017, although NHK did not report on the matter. Ryōichi Ueda, the chairman of NHK, visited the reporter's parents' home to offer them apologies. NHK has imposed rules on overtime and medical consultations as part of an effort to prevent similar incidents in the future.

=== Relationship with Johnny & Associates and Starto Entertainment ===
In regards to NHK's relationship with Johnny & Associates, they have stated that NHK acknowledges that sexual abuse allegations had been repeatedly reported for many years, but NHK also stated that they lacked awareness of the issue at that time and chose to neither follow up nor cover the issue entirely. In addition, they stated that they had failed in their role as a news media organization, and simply sat idle as many minors were sexually abused. On 8 September 2023, NHK said in a statement that they took the matter seriously, and that they would "work harder to ensure that human rights are more respected in the broadcasting industry" when it comes to using performers who best fit program content and production. The public broadcaster added that it did not fully acknowledge the sexual abuse matter despite various weekly magazine articles about the allegations and a Tokyo High Court ruling in 2004. A few weeks later, NHK announced that it would suspend new contracts with Johnny's performers–including for their annual New Year's Eve television special Kōhaku Uta Gassen–until the company had implemented compensation and prevention measures. In February 2024, the company announced a strict policy of terminating any talent formerly affiliated with Johnny & Associates on its programs and not allowing them to appear on new programs after the 2024 fiscal year. In October 2024, NHK Chairman Nobuo Inaba announced at a regular press conference that, he had confirmed efforts of Smile-Up to compensate victims and prevent recurrence, that the separation of management from Starto Entertainment was steadily progressing, and that requests to perform–including Kōhaku Uta Gassen for current Starto celebrities would resume. Commercial broadcasters had already announced on the resumption of new appointments to celebrities belonging to Starto.

=== Criticism over comments about Japanese wartime history ===
NHK has occasionally faced various criticisms for its treatment of Japan's wartime history.

Katsuto Momii (籾井 勝人), the 21st Director-General of NHK, caused controversy by discussing Japan's actions in World War II at his first press conference after being appointed on 20 December 2013. It was reported that Momii said NHK should support the Japanese government in its territorial dispute with China and South Korea. He also caused controversy by what some describe as the playing down of the comfort women issue in World War II, according to the Taipei Times, stating, "[South] Korea's statements that Japan is the only nation that forced this are puzzling. 'Give us money, compensate us', they say, but since all of this was resolved by the Japan–Korea peace treaty, why are they reviving this issue? It's strange." It was subsequently reported by The Japan Times that on his first day at NHK Momii asked members of the executive team to hand in their resignation on the grounds they had all been appointed by his predecessor.

A number of civil society groups protested against Momii's continued tenure as Director-General of NHK. On 27 January 2014, the Viewers' Community to Observe and Encourage NHK (NHKを監視・激励する視聴者コミュニティ) issued a public letter calling for Momii's resignation on the grounds that the remarks he made at his inaugural press conference were explosive. The letter stated that if Momii did not resign by the end of April, its members would freeze their licence fee payments for half a year. While Momii did not resign, he was not reappointed and retired after serving only one term of three years.

On 17 October 2014, The Times claimed to have received internal NHK documents which banned any reference to the Nanjing Massacre, to Japan's use of wartime sex slaves during World War II, and to its territorial dispute with China in its English-language broadcasting.

=== Black Lives Matter video ===
On 10 June 2020, NHK apologized and took down an 80-second video about the Black Lives Matter movement and George Floyd protests that was criticized for its "crude" animation of protesters and its focus on economic inequality rather than police brutality. An official statement signed by Yuichi Tabata, head of NHK's International News Division, was released through NHK's official website.

=== Olympics documentary claims ===
On 9 January 2022, NHK issued an apology over false allegations made in Director Naomi Kawase's Tokyo Olympics documentary. Kawase was selected by the IOC in 2018 to cover Japanese reactions to the event and later during the COVID-19 pandemic. Footage and captions in the documentary alleged that protesters were being paid money to attend anti-Olympics rallies. One of the men interviewed later stated he was "unsure" if he had actually attended any anti-Olympics rallies. NHK Osaka cited "editorial oversights" and "deficiencies in research", issuing an apology. Some anti-Olympic activists demanded that the documentary should be removed. Some activists were concerned that the misinformation was spread by NHK to silence those who opposed the Tokyo Olympics during the pandemic. NHK denied that the footage was deliberately fabricated to mislead the public. On 13 January 2022, the NHK Osaka director Terunobu Maeda apologized during a press conference, admitting that the captions "should not have been included". Once again, he denied that the incident was a fabrication. On 10 February 2022 NHK Osaka announced an internal review and fired 6 production staff members.

=== COVID-19 ===
In December 2023, Japan's Broadcasting Ethics and Program Improvement Organization (BPO) concluded that NHK had breached broadcasting ethics in its "News Watch 9" program, where people believed to have died from COVID-19 vaccine injury were treated as if they had died from COVID-19. Regarding the incident as an inappropriate way of reporting, NHK stated that it would take measures to avoid the repetition of the misconduct.

== Arrest of NHK Office Head in Tehran ==
In January 2026, following the 2025–2026 Iranian protests, reports emerged about the detention of Shin-Nosuke Kawashima, the head of the NHK office in Tehran, and his transfer to Evin Prison. The government of Japan confirmed the detention of one of its citizens in Tehran and stated that Tokyo authorities were in contact with the detainee and his family, demanding his swift release. Iranian officials have not yet officially confirmed the arrest. NHK stated that the safety of its staff is a priority, and no further information has been provided on the matter.

== Logo history ==
1925–1945 (still used very rarely as the emblem)

1945–1962

1962–1995

1995–2020 (original)

1995–2020 (alternate)

2020–present (original)

2020–present (alternate)

2025 (100th anniversary)

== See also ==
- Domo, the mascot of the NHK since 1998
- Hobankyo – Organization based in Japan that enforces Fuji Television copyright issues
- Icons
- Japan Prize Contest (NHK)
- Japanese television programs
- Media of Japan
- NHK Science & Technology Research Laboratories
- NHK Spring Company
- Takashi Tachibana
- Johnny & Associates
- Television in Japan
- TV Japan – a former mixed Japanese/English-language cable network partially owned by NHK airing in the United States
- Ultra-high-definition television
