= NHK Broadcasting Center =

Japanese broadcast facility in Shibuya, Tokyo

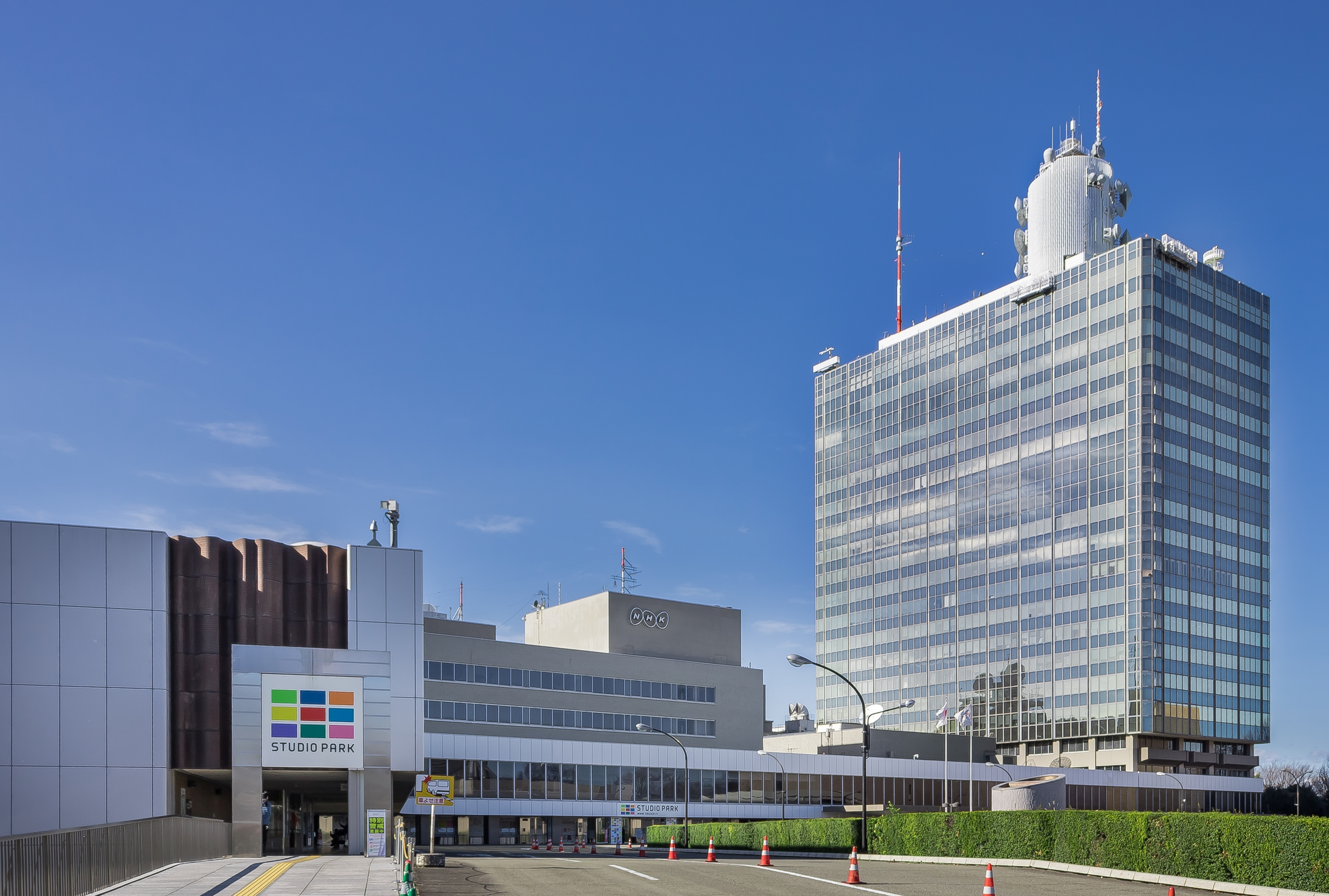
- NHK Broadcasting Center
- Interactive map of the NHK Broadcasting Center area

General information
- Type: Broadcasting Center, Performance Hall, Office
- Location: Shibuya, Tokyo
- Coordinates: 35.665833°N 139.696111°E
- Completed: March 1973
- Owner: NHK

The NHK Broadcasting Center (NHK放送センター, Enueichikei Hōsō Sentā), the headquarters of NHK, is located in Jinnan, Shibuya, Tokyo, Japan. It includes studios and offices, as well as shops and Studio Park, which is a popular attraction for schoolchildren and tourists.

Located within the same complex is the NHK Hall, in which performances are regularly held and often televised.

The center also hosts offices of international broadcasters, including KBS of South Korea, China Central Television, the Public Broadcasting Service, and the Australian Broadcasting Corporation.

A number of NHK-related companies have offices at buildings in nearby streets.

The center also houses the NHK Metropolitan Bureau which handles the main Kanto region feeds of NHK's radio and television services.

== Overview ==
Most of the nationwide network programs are produced and transmitted here, and it also serves as a base for block broadcasting for the Kanto-Koshinetsu region. There are satellite broadcasting stations that carry out satellite broadcasting and international broadcasting stations that carry out international broadcasting (NHK World TV, NHK World Radio Japan) outside of Japan.

=== Reconstruction on the Broadcasting Center ===
The Shibuya Broadcasting Center, which is also the headquarters of the Japan Broadcasting Corporation, is the oldest facility, and nearly half a century has passed since its construction. Therefore, from around 2010, it was decided to consider reconstructing all facilities as a "long-term project".

On August 30, 2016, the Japan Broadcasting Corporation announced the basic plan for rebuilding the broadcasting center. According to it, construction will start in September 2020, and the first phase of construction (information building) will be completed in 2025, the 100th anniversary of the start of broadcasting. After that, the second phase of construction (production/office building and public building) will be carried out, and the entire construction will be completed in 2036. Construction costs for the building (not including broadcasting equipment costs) are expected to be 170 billion yen.

On August 9, 2026, NHK moved most of its news operations – particularly the news studios and the Radio Center – to the Information Building, which was completed in October 2024. The international services were transferred on September 5, 2026.

== Information on the NHK Buildings ==
=== East Building (東館) ===
Completed in 1965, the oldest in the NHK Broadcasting Center.

=== West Building (西館) ===
Construction started after the completion of the East Building. Completed in 1968 as the second building.

=== Main Building (High-Rise) (本館) ===
The most conspicuous building in the NHK Broadcasting Center. Completed in 1972. After completion, the functions of the Tokyo Broadcasting Center (Former Headquarters) were transferred.

=== NHK Hall ===
NHK Hall (NHK ホール) is a multipurpose hall located in Shibuya Ward, Tokyo. The architectural design is Nikken Sekkei (日建設計). It was completed in November 1972 and started operation on June 20, 1973. The current one is the second generation, and the first NHK Hall existed in the NHK Tokyo Broadcasting Center. It is operated by the NHK Service Center, an affiliated corporation of the Japan Broadcasting Corporation (NHK).

It is also the home of the NHK Symphony Orchestra.

=== North Building (北館) ===
Completed in 1988.

== See also ==
- List of NHK broadcasting stations
