= Himitsu (disambiguation) =

Himitsu (Japanese: 秘密, secret), also known as Naoko, is a 1998 novel by Keigo Higashino.

Himitsu may also refer to:

- Himitsu (film), 1999 Japanese film based on the novel directed by Yōjirō Takita

== Music ==
- Himitsu (Yui Horie album), a 2012 studio album
- "Himitsu", a 2004 song by Shikao Suga
- "Himitsu", a 2005 song by Azumi Uehara
- "Himitsu", a 2005 Kazunari Ninomiya solo song on One (Arashi album)
- "Himitsu", a 2005 song by Hitomi Shimatani on the album Crossover
- "Himitsu" or "A Secret", a 2006 Tokyo Jihen song on the album Adult
- Himitsu, a 2008 album by singer aiko
- "Himitsu", a 2008 Kumi Koda song on the album Kingdom
- Bonnie Pink song "himitsu", on 2009 album One (Bonnie Pink album)
- "Himitsu", a 2011 song by Maaya Sakamoto on the album You Can't Catch Me
- "Himitsu" or "Secret", a 2011 song by singer Yuki

== Other uses ==
- Himitsu – Top Secret, a Japanese manga series written and illustrated by Reiko Shimizu

== See also ==
- Himitsu no Hanazono or The Secret Garden, 2007 Japanese television series
- Himitsu no hanazono (film) or My Secret Cache, 1997 Japanese film
- Himitsu Sentai Gorenger, Japanese television series from 1975 to 1977
- The Secret (2007 film), a French film based on Keigo Higashino's 1998 novel Himitsu
- Secret (disambiguation)
