= Park Shin-woo (director, born 1979) =

South Korean director

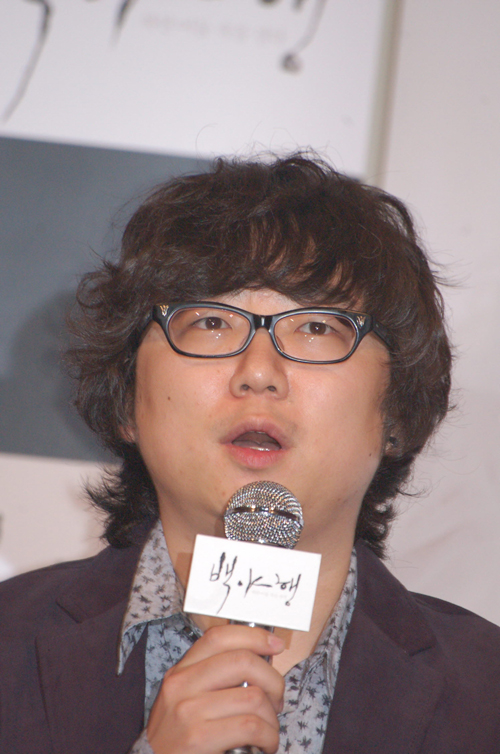
- Born: 1979 (age 46–47); South Korea
- Education: Hongik University Visual Design (Bachelor's Degree); Korea National University of Arts Film Institute
- Occupations: film director; screenwriter
- Years active: 2005 to present

Korean name
- Hangul: 박신우
- RR: Bak Sinu
- MR: Pak Sinu

Park Shin-woo (Korean: 박신우; born 1979) is South Korea film director. He is known for his feature film White Night, and dramas such as OCN Drama Trap (2019), SBS TV Drama The Killing Vote (2023), and Disney+ The Manipulated (2025).

== Career ==
During his time studying visual design at Hongik University, he won the Sunje Fund Award at the 9th Busan International Film Festival for his short film Goldfish. He gained attention for his short film About A Bad Boy which he made while studying at the Korea National University of Arts Film Institute, winning the Special Jury Prize at the 4th Mise-en-scène Short Film Festival.

His directorial debut in commercial feature film was White Night (2009). It was based on the Japanese novel Journey Under the Midnight Sun by Keigo Higashino.

== Filmography ==
=== Film ===
- 2004 Goldfish, short film, director
- 2005 About A Bad Boy, short film, director
- 2005 Five is Too Many, actor, minor role, police officer
- 2009 White Night, director, screenwriter
- 2016, Outrage, short film, director

=== Drama ===
- 2019 OCN Drama Trap, director, screenwriter (co-written)
- 2023 SBS TV Drama The Killing Vote, co-director
- 2025 Disney+ original series The Manipulated, co-director

== Accolades ==
=== Festival ===
- 2011 9th Mise-en-scène Short Film Festival, judge for the horror and fantasy category

=== Award ===
- 2004 Busan International Film Festival, Sunje Award, Goldfish
- 2005 4th Mise-en-scène Short Film Festival, Special Jury Award, About A Bad Boy
- 2005 3rd Asiana International Short Film Festival The Face of Short Films Award
