= Broken (2014 film) =

2014 South Korean film by Lee Jeong-ho

- Hangul: 방황하는 칼날
- Hanja: 彷徨하는 칼날
- RR: Banghwanghaneun kallal
- MR: Panghwanghanŭn k'allal
- Directed by: Lee Jeong-ho
- Written by: Lee Jeong-ho
- Based on: The Hovering Blade by Keigo Higashino
- Produced by: Im Sang-jin; Baek Gyeong-suk
- Starring: Jung Jae-young; Lee Sung-min
- Cinematography: Kim Tae-gyeong
- Edited by: Nam Na-yeong
- Music by: Kim Hong-jib
- Distributed by: CJ Entertainment
- Release date: April 10, 2014
- Running time: 122 minutes
- Country: South Korea
- Language: Korean
- Box office: US$3.56 million

Broken (Korean: 방황하는 칼날; lit. 'Hovering Blade; Roving Edge') is a 2014 South Korean action thriller film written and directed by Lee Jeong-ho. The film stars Jung Jae-young and Lee Sung-min in the lead roles. The narrative revolves around a father (played by Jung Jae-young) who becomes a fugitive as he hunts down the two men responsible for his daughter's rape and murder.

It is adapted from Keigo Higashino's 2004 novel The Hovering Blade (さまよう刃, Samayou Yaiba). This is the third South Korean film adapted from the Japanese novelist's work, after White Night (2009) and Perfect Number (2012).

== Plot ==
Widower Lee Sang-hyeon lives a quiet life with his 15-year-old daughter Su-jin. But one day she is abducted and raped, and her corpse is found at a derelict public bathhouse. Sang-hyeon is left helpless in the face of his daughter's death, with nothing left to cling on to but his feelings of anger and despair. The investigation into his daughter's death is progressing slowly, so restless and unable to sit quiet any longer, he decides to take matters into his own hands. Sang-hyeon receives an anonymous text message with information on the culprit, including an address where the sender claims Sang-hyeon would find electronic evidence of the crime; when he gets there, he sees a man, Kim Cheol-yong laughing as he watches a video showing Su-jin's rape and murder. Sang-hyeon accidentally kills Cheol-yong in a fit of rage, and upon learning that Cheol-yong had an accomplice, becomes hellbent on finding the second rapist/murderer. Upon examining Cheol-yong's murder scene, Jang Eok-gwan, the detective who leads the investigation into Su-jin's murder, realizes that Sang-hyeon was the killer and sets out on his trail.

== Cast ==
- Jung Jae-young - Lee Sang-hyeon
- Lee Sung-min - Jang Eok-gwan
- Seo Jun-young - Park Hyeon-soo
- Lee Soo-bin - Lee Su-jin
- Lee Joo-seung - Jo Doo-sik
- Choi Sang-wook - Kim Min-ki
- Kim Ji-hyeok - Kim Cheol-yong
- Kim Hong-pa - Team leader Goo
- Kim Dae-myung -Yang Tae-seop
- Jung Suk-yong - Min-ki's father
- Park Myeong-shin - Min-ki's mother
- Kim Hyun as Cheol-yong's mother
- Jo Yeon-ho - Cheol-yong's father
- Kim Seon-hwa - Mi-jin's mother
- Lee Joong-ok - Sang Hyun's section chief
- Oh Jung-se - Voice on the radio (cameo)

== Box office ==
Broken opened in second place at the box office behind Captain America: The Winter Soldier, attracting 458,000 admissions and ₩3.71 billion (US$3.56 million) from 592 screens on its first four days.
