= Galileo (Japanese TV series) =

Japanese TV series

- Japanese: ガリレオ
- Genre: Crime; Mystery
- Based on: 探偵ガリレオ by Keigo Higashino
- Starring: Masaharu Fukuyama; Ko Shibasaki; Yuriko Yoshitaka
- Theme music composer: Masaharu Fukuyama
- Opening theme: vs. ~Chikaku to Kairaku no Rasen~ (season 1); vs.2013 ~Chikaku to Kairaku no Rasen~ (season 2)
- Ending theme: KISS Shite (KOH+, season 1); Koi no Maryoku (KOH+, season 2)
- Composer: Yugo Kanno
- Country of origin: Japan
- Original language: Japanese
- No. of seasons: 2
- No. of episodes: 21

Production
- Executive producers: Hiroshi Nishitani; Takeshi Narita; Kensaku Sawada; Mizuki Nishisaka
- Producers: Yoshihiro Suzuki; Tadashi Makino; Hiroyuki Kikuchi
- Running time: 60 minutes
- Production company: Fuji TV Drama Production Center

Original release
- Network: Fuji TV
- Release: October 15, 2007 – June 17, 2013

Galileo (ガリレオ, Garireo) is a mystery crime Japanese television drama based on the Detective Galileo (探偵ガリレオ, Tantei Garireo) novels by Keigo Higashino (東野 圭吾, Higashino Keigo). It narrates the events and cases encountered by Kaoru Utsumi, a rookie police detective, and Manabu Yukawa, a genius science professor, as the two pair up to solve mysterious cases. The series premiered on Fuji TV on October 15, 2007, with a second season premiering six years later on April 15, 2013. Season two includes a two-part adaption of the novel Salvation of a Saint.

The series released three special feature-length episodes. "Galileo: Episode Zero", set three years before the first episode of season one, aired on October 4, 2008, on the same day as the release of the film Suspect X. Special episode "Galileo XX: Kaoru Utsumi's Last Case" (ガリレオXX内海薫最後の事件), a prequel of season two, premiered on Fuji TV on June 22, 2013, followed by Midsummer's Equation (真夏の方程式, Manatsu no hōteishiki) on June 29, 2013. The special episode "Galileo: The Forbidden Magic" (ガリレオ禁断の魔術) was premiered on Fuji TV on September 17, 2022.

Galileo became available on Netflix in January 2025. Season two on Netflix includes "Galileo XX: Kaoru Utsumi's Last Case" as episode 12.

== Premise ==
Kaoru Utsumi, a rookie detective who has just been reassigned to the criminal division, finds the investigation of her first murder case stalled by seemingly-supernatural phenomena surrounding the event. She seeks help from Shunpei Kusanagi, a senior detective at the police headquarter famous as a "Mystery Hunter". Kusanagi, however, reveals to Utsumi that he was only able to solve the cases thanks to his college friend, Teito University professor Manabu Yukawa. Yukawa is a tall, handsome, brilliant but eccentric scientist who is interested in nothing but physics, while Utsumi is a hot-blooded detective with a strong sense of justice. Together, the odd pair solves many difficult and seemingly impossible events with their individual talents.

== Cast ==
=== Season 1 ===
- Masaharu Fukuyama as Manabu Yukawa (湯川学, Yukawa Manabu)
- Ko Shibasaki as Kaoru Utsumi (内海薫, Utsumi Kaoru)
- Kazuki Kitamura as Shunpei Kusanagi (草薙俊平, Kusanagi Shunpei)
- Hiroshi Shinagawa as Shirō Yuge (弓削志郎, Yuge Shirō)
- Ikkei Watanabe as Hiromi Kuribayashi (栗林宏美, Kuribayashi Hiromi)
- Tsuyoshi Hayashi as Kensuke Murase (村瀬健介, Murase Kensuke)
- Hiroaki Fukui as Takashi Kobuchizawa (小淵沢隆史, Kobuchizawa Takashi)
- Takahiro Itō as Eita Mori (森英太, Mori Eita)
- Miyako Takayama as Miyuki Watanabe (渡辺美雪, Watanabe Miyuki)
- Aoi as Saeko Taniguchi (谷口紗江子, Taniguchi Saeko)
- Miki Maya as Sakurako Jonouchi (城ノ内桜子, Jōnouchi Sakurako)
- Mami Yamasaki as Chizuru Kakisaka (柿坂千鶴, Kakisaka Chizuru)
- Mayu Miura as Tōko Aoyagi (三浦まゆ, Aoyagi Tōko)
- Kinako Kobayashi as Maki Kadomatsu (門松マキ, Kadomatsu Maki)

=== Season 2 ===
- Masaharu Fukuyama as Manabu Yukawa (湯川学, Yukawa Manabu)
- Yuriko Yoshitaka as Misa Kishitani (岸谷美砂, Kishitani Misa)
- Yu Sawabe as Minoru Otagawa (太田川稔, Ōtagawa Minoru)
- Ikkei Watanabe as Hiromi Kuribayashi (栗林宏美, Kuribayashi Hiromi)
- Takafumi Imai as Kei Orikawa (折川圭, Orikawa Kei)
- Soran Tamoto as Tatsuya Unohara (宇野原達也, Unohara Tatsuya)
- Hayato Onozuka as Soichiro Takubo (田窪壮一郎, Takubo Sōichirō)
- Rina Aizawa as Misaki Tono (遠野みさき, Tōno Misaki)
- Aoi Yoshikura as Moeko Uesugi (上杉萌子, Uesugi Moeko)
- Yuto Marick Yasuhara as Isaac (アイザック, Aizakku)
- Ko Shibasaki as Kaoru Utsumi (内海薫, Utsumi Kaoru)
- Kazuki Kitamura as Shunpei Kusanagi (草薙俊平, Kusanagi Shunpei)

=== Guests ===
==== Season 1 ====
- 1st episode: Toshiaki Karasawa as Tatsuo Kanamori (金森龍男, Kanamori Tatsuo)
- 2nd episode: Mantaro Koichi as Hiroshi Uemura (上村宏, Uemura Hiroshi)
- 3rd episode: Ryōko Hirosue as Yayoi Kanzaki (神崎弥生, Kanzaki Yayoi)
- 4th episode: Shingo Katori (SMAP) as Shoichi Tagami (田上昇一, Tagami Shōichi)
  - Sora Aoi - victim of 4th episode
- 5th episode: Suzuka Ohgo as Akiho Yajima (矢島秋穂, Yajima Akiho)
  - Miki Mizuno - wife of victim of 5th episode
- 6th episode: Maki Horikita as Remi Morisaki (森崎礼美, Morisaki Remi)
  - Hirofumi Arai - a fortune teller, stalking Remi
- 7th episode: Kyoko Fukada as Shizuko Sugawara (菅原静子, Sugawara Shizuko)
  - Shigeyuki Sato as Minemura Kazuhide (峰村英和, Kazuhide Minemura)
- 8th episode: Yumiko Shaku as Chiaki Maeda (前田千晶, Maeda Chiaki)
- 9th and final episodes: Hiroshi Kume as Seishiro Kijima (木島征志郎, Kijima Seishirō)
- Guests for Episode Φ (Zero)
  - Masami Nagasawa as Akari Shionoya (塩野谷あかり, Shionoya Akari)
  - Ayaka Komatsu as Yoko Hirahara (平原瑤子, Hirahara Yōko)
  - Karina as Namie Shindo (新藤奈美恵, Shindō Namie)
  - Tomoharu Hasegawa as Sosuke Hosono (紺野宗介, Hosono Sōsuke)
  - Kazuki Namioka as the victim
  - Toshifumi Muramatsu as Professor Murata (村田教授, Murata-kyōju)
  - Bengal as Saburo Tokorozawa (所沢三郎, Tokorozawa Saburō)
  - Keizo Kanie as Yukimasa Tomonaga (友永幸正, Tomonaga Yukimasa)

==== Season 2 ====
- 1st episode: Takao Osawa as Shiko Renzaki (連崎至光, Renzaki Shikō)
- 2nd episode: Haruna Kawaguchi as Kanako Mase (真瀬加奈子, Mase Kanako)
- 3rd episode: Yuko Oshima as Mutsumi Wakizaka (脇坂睦美, Wakizaka Mutsumi)
- 4th episode: Seiichi Tanabe as Tadamasa Yanagisawa (柳沢忠正, Yanagisawa Tadamasa)
  - Atsuya Furuta - Yanagisawa's training partner
- 5th episode: Mirei Kiritani as Wakana Isoya (磯谷若菜, Isoya Wakana) and Haruna Mikami (三上春菜, Mikami Haruna) (dual role)
- 6th episode: Yui Natsukawa as Yuko Nogi (野木祐子, Nogi Yūko)
- 7th episode: Yuu Kashii as Yui Kojima (小島結衣, Kojima Yui)
- 8th episode: Yū Aoi as Atsuko Kanbara (神原敦子, Kanbara Atsuko)
- 9th episode: Katsuhisa Namase as Eiji Takado (高藤英治, Takadō Eiji)
- 10th and final episodes: Yūki Amami as Ayane Mashiba (真柴綾音, Mashiba Ayane)
- Guests for Galileo XX
  - Yuya Yagira as Kento Tōma (当摩健斗, Tōma Kento)
  - Yusuke Santamaria as Kenichi Jōnen (上念研一, Jōnen Kenichi)
  - Masato Ibu as Ikuo Sekioka (関岡郁夫, Sekioka Ikuo)
  - Kimiko Yo as Yoriko Takasaki (髙﨑依子, Takasaki Yoriko)
  - Megumi Oji as the victim
  - Michie Ikeda and Koichiro Kanzaki as the victim parents
  - Kenichi Takito as the second victim
  - Masayo Umezawa as Horiguchi (堀口, Horiguchi)
  - Koen Kondo as Mitsuyuki Takiyama (瀧山充幸, Takiyama Mitsuyuki)

=== Galileo: Kindan no Majutsu ===
- Masaharu Fukuyama as Manabu Yukawa (湯川学, Yukawa Manabu)
- Yuko Araki as Tomoka Makimura (牧村朋佳, Makimura Tomoka)
- Yu Sawabe as Minoru Otagawa (太田川稔, Ōtagawa Minoru)
- Kazuki Kitamura as Shunpei Kusanagi (草薙俊平, Kusanagi Shunpei)
- Ikkei Watanabe as Hiromi Kuribayashi (栗林宏美, Kuribayashi Hiromi)
- Nijiro Murakami as Shingo Koshiba (古芝伸吾, Koshiba Shingo)
- Nana Mori as Yurina Kurasaka (倉坂由里奈, Kurasaka Yurina)
- Aki Asakura as Akiho Koshiba (古芝秋穂, Koshiba Akiho)
- Tetsu Hirahara as the victim
- Tomokazu Koshimura as Mikio Katsuta (勝田幹夫, Katsuta Mikio)
- Nakamura Kasho IV as Kozo Yonemura (米村幸三, Yonemura Kōzō)
- Kosuke Suzuki as Jinshaku Oga (鈴木浩介, Ōga Jinshaku)
- Masatoshi Nakamura as Kazuro Ukai (鵜飼和郎, Ukai Kazurō)

== Episodes ==
=== Season 1 ===
| No. | Title | Directed by | Written by | Original release date |
|---|---|---|---|---|
| 1 | "Burns (Weirdo Genius Scientist)"; Transliteration: "Moeru" (Japanese: 燃える（変人天才科学者）) | Yasushi Fukuda | Hiroshi Nishitani | October 15, 2007 |
A young man dies from burns to the head while out one night partying with his friends. Police investigators believe it to be an accident caused by the firecrackers the deceased possesses, but his friends claim spontaneous human combustion. Kaoru Utsumi, the rookie police investigator assigned to this case, seeks help from Manabu Yukawa, an associate professor at Teito University. The two begin their investigation and discover the dark truth behind the murder. Main Guest: Toshiaki Karasawa.
| 2 | "Floats (Mystery of OL Murderer and the Flying Boy!)"; Transliteration: "Nukeru" (Japanese: 離脱る（OL殺人と空を飛ぶ少年の謎!）) | Yasushi Fukuda | Hiroshi Nishitani | October 22, 2007 |
An OL is found murdered in her apartment. The police quickly apprehend a man, the victim's insurance agent, who they believe to be the perpetrator. The man claims to have been taking a nap in his vehicle when the murder took place, but is unable to produce a credible alibi. However, a boy comes forward and claims to have seen the man's vehicle near his house, which is considerably distant from the murder scene. The only catch is that the boy claims to have seen the vehicle while experiencing astral projection. Main Guest: Yuuki Imai.
| 3 | "Poltergeist (Missing Husband and the Dark House Cursed by Ghost!)"; Transliteration: "Sawagu" (Japanese: 騒霊ぐ（消えた夫と幽霊の棲む黒い家!）) | Osho Furuya | Takeshi Narita | October 29, 2007 |
After working overnight, the exhausted Utsumi receives a call from Yukawa, who asks her for help in finding the brother-in-law of one of his students. The man has been missing for over a week, and the wife has tracked down the last known location of her husband - a house owned by a recently deceased old woman and now occupied by the woman's nephew and some suspicious persons. The wife believes that her husband is in the house, and convinces Utsumi to search the house with her. However, while they search the premises, the house suddenly rattles violently. The frightened Utsumi believes it to be the rage of a poltergeist. Main Guest: Ryōko Hirosue
| 4 | "Necrosis (Handsome Genius and Dangerous Seduction of the Murderer)"; Transliteration: "Kusaru" (Japanese: 壊死る（美しき天才殺人者の危険な誘惑）) | Yasushi Fukuda | Kensaku Sawada | November 5, 2007 |
A girl is found dead in the swimming pool of her house. The cause of death is determined to be a heart attack, and police rule the death to be by natural causes. However, Utsumi spots a purple mark on the victim's chest, and asks the coroner to analyze it. It is revealed to be necrosis, which prompts Utsumi to consider the girl's death suspicious. It is later revealed that two more victims have died under similar circumstances, which strengthens Utsumi's belief that this is a homicide case. Main Guests: Shingo Katori, Sora Aoi
| 5 | "Strangulation (The Mystery of the Fireball and the Perfect Closed-room Murderer)"; Transliteration: "Shimeru" (Japanese: 絞殺る（火の玉の謎と完全なる密室殺人）) | Osho Furuya | Takeshi Narita | November 12, 2007 |
A man is found murdered in a hotel room. There is no sign of forced entry, no sign of any struggle, and witnesses claim no one has entered the room besides the victim. Another witness who works in the building across from the window claims to have seen ghostly fireballs - a statement that interests Yukawa and prompts him to uncover the secret behind the man's death. Main Guests: Suzuka Ohgo, Miki Mizuno
| 6 | "Fantasy (Love of the Future and a Long Night Together)"; Transliteration: "Yumemiru" (Japanese: 夢想る（未来の恋と二人きりの長い夜）) | Otaro Matsumoto | Hiroshi Nishitani | November 19, 2007 |
One of Utsumi's childhood friends is wanted for breaking and entering into a young girl's house. While on the run, he contacts Utsumi and claims to have known the girl for a long time, and it was she who told him to go to his house. There is also evidence suggesting this man has known the girl since he was a child and the girl was not even born yet, and that there is an unknown tie between him, the girl, and Utsumi. Utsumi, determined to help his friend, persuades Yukawa to solve the mystery behind the man's dream. Main Guest: Maki Horikita, Hirofumi Arai
| 7 | "Foresight (Murder Device of Horror Loved by the Beautiful Wife)"; Transliteration: "Shiru" (Japanese: 予知る（美しき妻の愛した恐怖の殺人装置）) | Osho Furuya | Mizuki Nishisaka | November 26, 2007 |
An ordinary man who doesn't have much physical appeal to others has just married a beautiful woman, and when another pretty woman flirts with him, he gets completely carried away and cheats on his newly-wedded wife. Now the mistress demands that he divorce his wife or she will hang herself, which she does, dying across the street in a building where the guy was able to see her through his window. Police come, the news spreads, and the beautiful wife learns about the mistress and leaves the man. It is a common love-triangle-gone-bad situation, only that the man claims that he had seen somebody trying to hang herself in the exact same manner in the exact same unit across the street only a week ago. What did he really see? Does he really have the power of precognition? Main Guest: Kyoko Fukada
| 8 | "Spiritual Sight (The Ghost Who Notified Her Sister of the Murder!)"; Transliteration: "Miru" (Japanese: 霊視る（殺人事件を知らせた姉の幽霊!）) | Osho Furuya | Takeshi Narita | December 3, 2007 |
A cooking instructor is murdered in her office, but while she is being murdered, she mysteriously appears right before her sister, who was 30 kilometers away from the office, to warn her about the killing. Main Guest: Yumiko Shaku
| 9 | "Transcription (Serial Murder Set up by the Devil)"; Transliteration: "Utsuru" (Japanese: 転写る（悪魔が仕掛けた連続殺人）) | Osho Furuya | Mizuki Nishisaka | December 10, 2007 |
A man is found dead from exploding in a lake. Meanwhile, at a school, an art student has produced a piece he calls "The Death Mask", which accurately represents the face of a missing person. A disturbing past is also discovered between Yukawa and the prime suspects of the murders. Main Guest: Hiroshi Kume
| 10 | "Explosion (Kiss on Christmas Eve!)"; Transliteration: "Hazeru" (Japanese: 爆ぜる（聖夜にKISSして!）) | Yasushi Fukuda; Osho Furuya | Kensaku Sawada | December 17, 2007 |
Yukawa confronts his ex-teacher regarding double-murders which then led to the death of the teacher's secretary. Afterwards, Utsumi is faced with a life-threatening situation that only Yukawa can handle. Main Guest: Hiroshi Kume

=== Season 2 ===
| No. | Title | Directed by | Written by | Original release date |
|---|---|---|---|---|
| 1 | "Delusion (The Weirdo Returns! The First Episode is Physics vs Psychokinesis!!)"; Transliteration: "Madowasu" (Japanese: 幻惑す（帰ってきた変人! 第1話は物理学対念力!!）) | Yasushi Fukuda | Mizuki Nishisaka | April 15, 2013 |
The death of a young man who jumps out of a window is photographed as it happens by a pair of reporters who are preparing a story on a new religious cult. However, the cult's leader claims this was not really a suicide, as it was the result of psychic pressure applied to cleanse the young man's guilt.
| 2 | "Guide (The Crystal Pendulum that Brings Death! The Weirdo vs Bishōjo)"; Transliteration: "Shimesu" (Japanese: 指標す（死を呼ぶ水晶振り子! 変人vs美少女）) | Yasushi Fukuda | Mizuki Nishisaka | April 22, 2013 |
Detective Kishitani has deduced the basic outline of how and why a kindly grandmother was murdered, but her case report is rejected because it states that some of the evidence was discovered by dowsing. She is mortified that her colleagues are starting to call her "Occult-chan", and turns to Yukawa to sort out the truth behind the dowsing.
| 3 | "Listen (Revengeful Ghosts in a Series of Mysterious Deaths in the Company!)"; Transliteration: "Kikoeru" (Japanese: 心聴る（復讐する亡霊社内連続怪死事件!）) | Yasushi Fukuda | Kensaku Sawada | April 29, 2013 |
Detective Kishitani attended the funeral of an employee of a company, who was a senior in the university circle. On the spot, the company president goes mad when he hears the voice of her, who should have died, and commits suicide. Yukawa, who has heard about the chaos situation on the phone, becomes interested in the cause of the voices, and begins an investigation with Kishitani.
| 4 | "Bend (The Invisible Intruder and the Mystery of the Magic Ball! Remote Arson)"; Transliteration: "Magaru" (Japanese: 曲球る（姿なき侵入者と魔球の謎! 遠隔放火）) | Yasushi Fukuda | Mizuki Nishisaka | May 6, 2013 |
A stove ignites in a professional baseball player house, causing his wife's death. When detective Kishitani interviews the baseball player, she learns that the couple's relationship is not on good terms, and casts suspicious eyes on him. However, at the time of his wife's death, the baseball player had an alibi of practicing pitching with his practice partner, and an advisor for a scientific experiment, and Yukawa was the advisor. Yukawa sets out to find out what happened to baseball player, who is shaken by the incident and unable to concentrate on his practice, but unable to shake off his suspicions, he asks Yukawa to investigate further.
| 5 | "Convulsions (A Witness at a Distance of 200 Kilometers! The Mystery of Twins)"; Transliteration: "Okuru" (Japanese: 念波る（距離200キロの目撃者! 双子の神秘）) | Yasushi Fukuda | Kensaku Sawada | May 13, 2013 |
A woman who runs an antique shop, is attacked by someone and falls into a coma. At the same time as being attacked, her twin sister senses her sister's danger and calls her husband. After hearing about the incident from detective Kishitani, Yukawa says that although he often hears that the twins have unexplained communication skills, it can be explained theoretically that it is just a coincidence and an assumption. However, several sets of twins brought by Kishitani appear before Yukawa, and they testify about their mysterious abilities one after another, but Yukawa replies that it is also a coincidence and asks Kishitani why she is so obsessed with twins.
| 6 | "Closed Doors (vs. Female Scientist!! 20 Minutes of Blank Murder)"; Transliteration: "Tojiru" (Japanese: 密室る（vs女性科学者!! 空白の20分の殺人術）) | Yasushi Fukuda | Hiro Kanai | May 20, 2013 |
On her day off, detective Kishitani attends a mountain hiking event in Yamanashi that she learned about through SNS. A female researcher from a famous company who arrives at the pension after Kishitani, says, "I'm tired," after a brief greeting, shuts herself in her room, and doesn't show up at dinner. A worried Kishitani and a fellow researcher who planned the event and is her superior, who arrived later, visits the room, but the room is locked and there is no reply. Some time later, the owner of the pension finds tracks of the female researcher leaving the balcony, and the next morning, her body was found in a mountain stream. After hearing Kishitani's story, Yukawa becomes interested in the scientific reason, and visits the crime scene.
| 7 | "Camouflage (Through the Wall!? The Tengu Legend Murder Case!)"; Transliteration: "Yosoou" (Japanese: 偽装う（壁を抜ける!? 天狗伝説殺人事件!）) | Yasushi Fukuda; Kosuke Nishi | Mizuki Nishisaka | May 27, 2013 |
Yukawa attends an academic conference in Ibaraki accompanied by Kuribayashi and a female seminar student. On the way back, Yukawa and Kuribayashi are invited by her to see the "Tengu's Mummy" at a local shrine in Tochigi. However, when they arrive at the shrine, they cannot enter the shrine where the mummies are located, and a local policeman and her childhood friend, appears. In fact, the priest of the shrine said, "Karasu Tengu is coming to take back the mummy," so the shrine was hardened with concrete. Moreover, the Shinto priest was found as a skeletal corpse at the shrine two weeks ago. Misaki brought Yukawa to the shrine to investigate the case. Then, a young woman who has become soaking wet, appears there. She is their childhood friend, and before arriving at the shrine, she was the woman who lent an umbrella to Yukawa when he was caught in a sudden shower.
| 8 | "Acting (vs. Crazy Actress! Under the Fireworks Dancing in the Night sky, the Curtain of the Murder Theater Opens...)"; Transliteration: "Enjiru" (Japanese: 演技る（vs狂気の女優! 夜空に舞う花火の下で殺人劇場の幕が開く…）) | Yasushi Fukuda | Kensaku Sawada | June 3, 2013 |
A representative of a popular theater company is stabbed to death in his home. About 20 minutes before that, he called a leading actress of the theater company, and a woman who was in charge of costumes, but did not say a word. Sensing his accident from the phone, the two visited his apartment, used the duplicate key the actress had, entered the room, and found the body. Detective Kishitani finds out that they were lovers in the investigation that follows, and looks at her with suspicion and asks Yukawa for help. Yukawa proves a certain way to break her alibi.
| 9 | "Disturb (Targeted Yukawa!! The Devil's Hand Horror Experiment)"; Transliteration: "Midasu" (Japanese: 攪乱す（狙われた湯川!! 悪魔の手の恐怖実験）) | Yasushi Fukuda | Hiro Kanai | June 10, 2013 |
Kaizuka Kita Police Station and Yukawa receive a statement of responsibility from a person who claims to be the "Devil's Hand". It was a threat to the police and a declaration of war against Yukawa. As the letter suggests, there were two cases of suspicious accidental deaths one after another, and in both cases there was a post on the website that appeared to be a criminal notice the day before. At the same time, an article was published in a weekly magazine that said Yukawa was cooperating with the police.
| 10 | "Saint's Salvation: Part One (Last Chapter - Saint's Salvation: Part One - The Perfect Crime Named Love!!)"; Transliteration: "Seijo no Kyusai: Zenpen" (Japanese: 聖女の救済 前編（最終章・聖女の救済－前編－ 愛という名の完全犯罪!!）) | Yasushi Fukuda | Mizuki Nishisaka | June 17, 2013 |
| 11 | "Saint's Salvation: Part Two (Finally the Final Episode! Saint's Salvation: Part Two - Really, Really Funny! Goodbye! Professor Yukawa)"; Transliteration: "Seijo no Kyusai: Kohen" (Japanese: 聖女の救済 後編（遂に最終回! 聖女の救済－後編－ 実に、実に、面白い! さよなら!湯川先生）) | Yasushi Fukuda | Kensaku Sawada | June 24, 2013 |
A company owner was found murdered in his home. After arsenic was detected in the coffee he drank, the police determined that he was poisoned by premeditated murder. His wife, was Yukawa's middle school classmate. She was divorced from Yoshiyuki just before he was murdered, and detective Kishitani suspected her, but she had an alibi that had returned to Hokkaido on the day of the incident.

== Ratings ==
| Season | Timeslot | Season premiere | Season finale | Rating (Kanto) | Rating (Kansai) |
|---|---|---|---|---|---|
| 1 | Monday 9:00 p.m. | October 15, 2007 | December 17, 2007 | 21.91 | 22.45 |
| 2 | Monday 9:00 p.m. | April 15, 2013 | June 24, 2013 | 19.19 | N/A |

== Film-length special episodes ==
The following special episodes are over 60 minutes in length. Two were released theatrically.

- Galileo: Episode Zero (2008) – TV movie
- Suspect X (2008) (aka "The Devotion of Suspect X")
- Galileo XX: Kaoru Utsumi's Last Case (ガリレオXX内海薫最後の事件) (2013) – TV movie
- Midsummer's Equation (2013)

== Films post-series ==
- Silent Parade (2022)
- Forbidden Magic (2022) (Galileo: Kindan no Majutsu; ガリレオ 禁断の魔術) – TV movie

== Video game ==
An adventure game based on the series was developed by Tomcat System and published by D3Publisher for Nintendo DS on October 16, 2008.
