= The Devotion of Suspect X =

2005 novel by Keigo Higashino

- First edition (Japanese)
- Author: Keigo Higashino
- Original title: Yōgisha X no Kenshin 容疑者Xの献身
- Translator: Alexander O. Smith
- Language: Japanese
- Series: Detective Galileo
- Genre: Crime / Mystery novel
- Published: 2005 (Bungeishunjū) (Japanese); 2011 (Minotaur Books) (English)
- Publication place: Japan
- Media type: Print (Hardback & Paperback)
- Pages: 352
- ISBN: 4-16-323860-3
- Preceded by: Yochimu 予知夢
- Followed by: Salvation of a Saint 聖女の救済

The Devotion of Suspect X (容疑者Xの献身, Yōgisha Ekkusu no Kenshin) is a 2005 novel by Keigo Higashino, the first in his Detective Galileo series and is his most acclaimed work thus far. The novel won him numerous awards, including the 134th Naoki Prize, which is a highly regarded award in Japan. The novel also won the 6th Honkaku Mystery Award, which is one of the most prestigious awards in the mystery novels category in Japan. 2006 Honkaku Mystery Best 10 and Kono Mystery ga Sugoi! 2006, annual mystery fiction guide books published in Japan, ranked the novel as the number one.

The English translation was nominated for the 2012 Edgar Award for Best Novel and the 2012 Barry Award for Best First Novel.

== Plot ==
The story begins with Tetsuya Ishigami and Yasuko Hanaoka following their daily routines. Yasuko is a divorced single mother who works at a bento shop. Ishigami is a highly talented mathematics teacher, who lives next door to Yasuko and her daughter, Misato.

Yasuko's abusive ex-husband, Togashi, shows up one day to extort money from her. He threatens both her and her daughter. The situation quickly escalates into domestic violence, prompting Yasuko and Misato to kill Togashi in self-defense. Overhearing the commotion, Ishigami, who is secretly enamoured of Yasuko but has never told her so, offers his help, disposing of the body and plotting the cover-up of the murder step-by-step.

When the body is discovered and identified, Detective Kusanagi, who was initially investigating the disappearance of Togashi, is assigned the case and Yasuko comes under suspicion. Kusanagi is unable to find any obvious holes in Yasuko's manufactured alibi, but he is certain that there is something wrong with her alibi, a suspicion that he cannot shake. Kusanagi brings in Dr. Manabu Yukawa, a physicist and his college friend who frequently consults with the police. Yukawa also went to college with Ishigami, where he learned of Ishigami's problem-solving techniques and abilities; Yukawa highly rates Ishigami's intelligence. After meeting him again after so many years, Yukawa becomes convinced that Ishigami had something to do with the murder. What ensues is a high-level battle of wits between Yukawa and Ishigami, as Ishigami tries to protect Yasuko by outmaneuvering and outthinking Yukawa; the teacher is Yukawa's most clever and determined opponent yet.

Towards the end, both Ishigami's scheme and the reason for his devotion to Yasuko are revealed: Ishigami had lost his will to live due to his depression, and was prepared to commit suicide when he was interrupted by Yasuko and Misato introducing themselves, leading him to become deeply attached to her and thankful for her unknowingly saving his life. In order to deceive the investigation, Ishigami murdered a second person, a homeless man who he had seen prior on his commute to work, and made the police believe he was Togashi, in order to obfuscate the time of the murder and make it so that in the end he could take the fall.

Yukawa is ultimately able to figure out his scheme and cannot accept his friend's sacrifice, and so he tells Yasuko the truth. She is deeply moved and despite Ishigami's instructions to move forward, is unable to live with the guilt. The book ends with her meeting Ishigami in jail, revealing that she and Misato have confessed to killing Togashi and are determined to serve their sentence together with him, leaving him in tears.

== Characters ==
- Tetsuya Ishigami (石神 哲哉, Ishigami Tetsuya)

Solitary Maths teacher who has fallen in love with Yasuko

- Yasuko Hanaoka (花岡 靖子, Hanaoka Yasuko)

A single mother who murdered her ex-husband

- Misato Hanaoka (花岡 美里, Hanaoka Misato)

Yasuko's daughter from a previous marriage

- Manabu "Galileo" Yukawa

Tetsuya Ishigami's old college friend, both are as intelligent as the other.

- Shunpei Kusanagi

Detective in charge of dealing with the case of Togashi's murder

- Shinji Togashi (富樫 慎二, Togashi Shinji)

Yasuko's ex-husband who stalked her and is later killed by her and her daughter, the victim of the crime under investigation

== Awards and nominations ==
Japanese awards

- 2006 - Honkaku Mystery Award for Best Fiction
- 2006 - Naoki Prize
- 2006 - The Best Japanese Crime Fiction of the Year (Kono Mystery ga Sugoi! 2006)
- 2006 - The Best Japanese Crime Fiction of the Year (2006 Honkaku Mystery Best 10)
- 2012 - Ranked as the No. 13 novel on the Top 100 Japanese Mystery Novels of All Time

U.S. awards

- 2012 - Nominee for Edgar Award for Best Novel
- 2012 - Nominee for Barry Award for Best First Novel
- 2012 - Chosen by the American Library Association as Best Mystery Novel for their 2012 reading list

== Adaptations ==
- The novel was made into a 2008 Japanese film, Suspect X, starring Shinichi Tsutsumi as Tetsuya Ishigami and Masaharu Fukuyama as Manabu Yukawa, directed by Hiroshi Nishitani.
- The 2012 South Korean film adaptation Perfect Number (Korean: 용의자X; lit. "Suspect X") stars Ryoo Seung-bum, Lee Yo-won and Cho Jin-woong, and was directed by Bang Eun-jin.
- A Chinese film adaptation, The Devotion of Suspect X, was released in 2017. The film was directed by Alec Su, and features Ruby Lin and Wang Kai.
- It was also adapted into a 2019 Tamil movie titled Kolaigaran starring Vijay Antony and Arjun.
- On September 21, 2023, Netflix released the Hindi adaptation, Jaane Jaan, directed by Sujoy Ghosh and starring Kareena Kapoor with Jaideep Ahlawat and Vijay Varma.
- The English language film adaptation rights were acquired by Kross Pictures in 2011, and is being developed in Los Angeles, California under the working title The Devotion of Suspect X.

== See also ==
- Galileo (Japanese TV series)
- Drishyam
