= Ayame Koike =

Japanese actress

- Born: February 13, 1995 (age 30); Kanagawa Prefecture, Japan
- Occupation: Actress
- Years active: 2004 – present

Ayame Koike (小池彩夢, Koike Ayame; born February 13, 1995) is a Japanese actress under the Sony Music Artists.

Koike made her acting debut in the Japanese television drama Botan to Bara as Rika Nojima in 2004. In 2007, Koike appeared in NHK Educational TV's Yuhigaoka Boy Detectives (夕陽ヶ丘の探偵団, Yūhi ga Oka no Tanteidan) as Hikari Tsukishima, the only female in the detective group. 2007 was also the year Koike made her first appearance in films starring in Sakuran and Always Zoku Sanchōme no Yūhi. In Sakuran, Koike played the part of the young Kiyoha, the main character of the story. In Always Zoku Sanchōme no Yūhi, Koike played as Mika Suzuki, a relative that moves in to live with the Suzuki family at the beginning of the movie after her father's business ended in failure. In 2010, Koike played Mizuki Tsuji in the stage production Alice in Deadly School. In 2011, Koike was starring in Into the White Night, the theatrical adaptation of Journey Under the Midnight Sun.

Koike was one of three receivers of the Judges' Special Acting Award at the 17th Japan Movie Critics Awards in 2008. Koike and the other two receivers of the award, Kenta Suga and Kazuki Koshimizu, were granted the award in recognition of their performance in Always Zoku Sanchōme no Yūhi.

Koike released her first photobook on February 13, 2009. Koike commented on one photo where she holds a scarf up to her mouth, stating that she liked it because the look of her gaze staring straight at the camera made her look like an adult. Her mother was reported as being quite shocked about how mature Koike looked in the photographs. Koike's first idol DVD named Hatsukoi (初恋) was released in 2009 and her second DVD named Soshite, Chiisana Koi (そして、小さな恋) was released in 2010.

Koike is one of eleven girls in the girl group Tokyo Cheer Cheer Party.

== Filmography ==
Year	Film	Role	Notes
2007	Sakuran	Kiyoha (Young)	
2007	Always Zoku Sanchōme no Yūhi	Mika Suzuki	Japan Movie Critics Award for Judges' Special Acting Award
2011	Into the White Night	Mika Shinozuka	
