= Kayoko Kishimoto =

Japanese actress (born 1960)

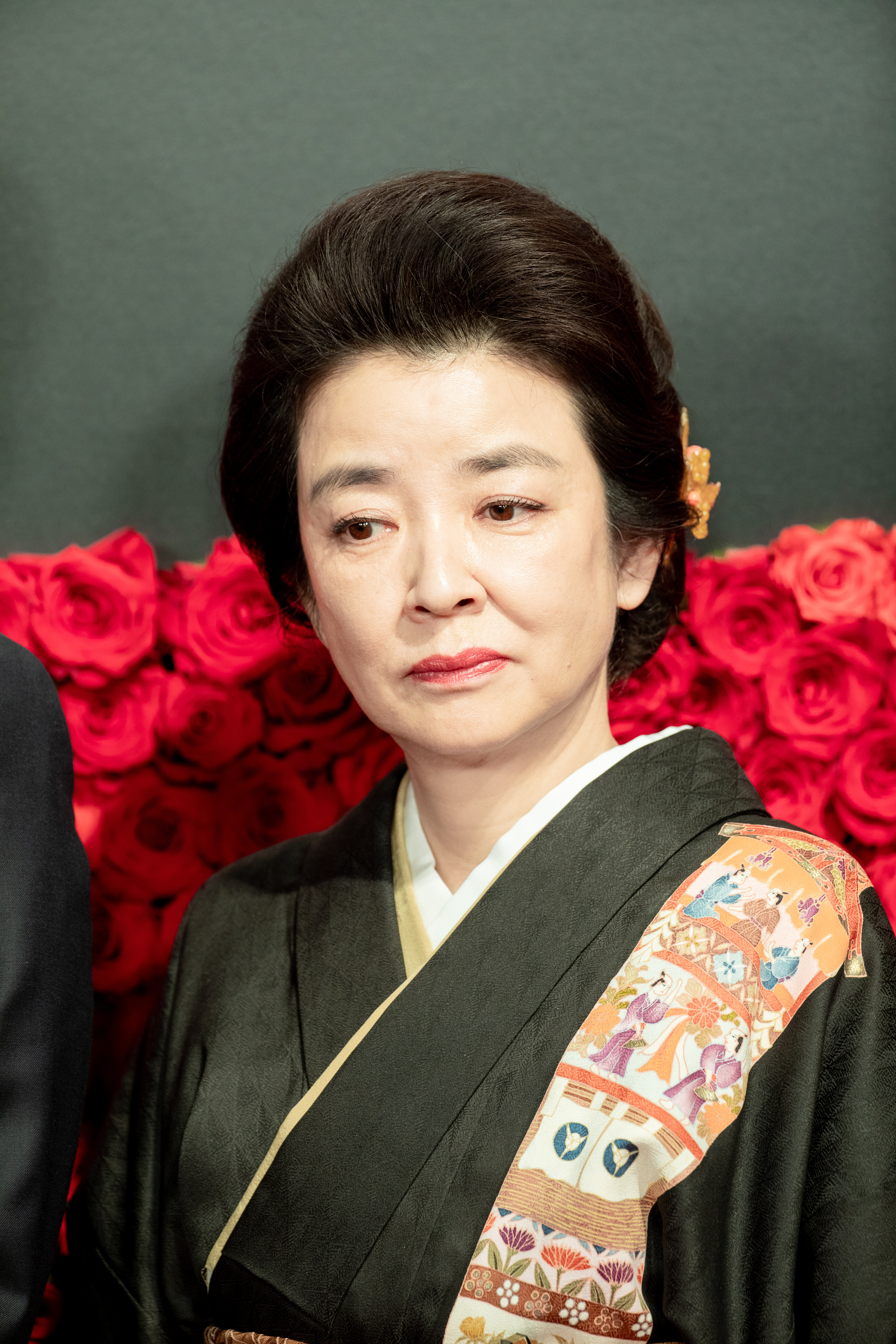
- Born: 29 December 1960 (age 65); Shizuoka, Japan
- Occupation: Actress
- Years active: 1976–present

Kayoko Kishimoto (岸本加世子, Kishimoto Kayoko; born 29 December 1960 in Shizuoka, Japan) is an actress.

She appeared in several of Takeshi Kitano's films, such as Hana-bi, Kikujiro and Dolls. She won the award for best supporting actress at the 23rd Japan Academy Prize for Kikujiro.

== Biography ==
In 1976 at a Hideki Saijo concert in Yokohama Dreamland, Kishimoto was scouted by Saijo and joined the agency. She debuted in the 1977 TBS drama "Mu" and first appeared as an idol in TV dramas, movies and commercials. She also began singing. She became a serious TV and movie actress, winning several well-known awards.

Kishimoto gained popularity for her commercials, including a Manzai double act with Kirin Kiki in the 1980s, Fujifilm, Orient Finance and her performance alongside Sonny Chiba in Toyota Carina commercials.

Recently she appeared in several Takeshi Kitano films playing characters with complex personalities. She continues to appear in television dramas and variety shows and wrote essays and novels.

== Personal life ==
Kishimoto is friends with boxer Joichiro Tatsuyoshi. In later years Hibari Misora was close to Kishimoto. Kiwako Taichi and Tomoko Naraoka introduced Hibari to Kishimoto.

== Filmography ==
=== Films ===
- Tora-san's Promise (1981), Aiko Odajima
- Hana-bi (1997), Miyuki
- Kikujiro (1999)
- Himitsu (1999)
- Dolls (2002)
- Takeshis (2005)
- Glory to the Filmmaker! (2007)
- When Will You Return? (2017)
- Lying to Mom (2018)
- Shinpei (2025), narrator
- Fujiko (2026)

=== Television ===
- Totto TV (2016), Sadako Sawamura
- Shiroi Kyotō (2019), Yoshie Sasaki
- Iron Chef (1999), Judge
