= Naoko (novel) =

1998 novel by Keigo Higashino

- Author: Keigo Higashino
- Original title: Himitsu (秘密)
- Translator: Kerim Yasar
- Language: Japanese
- Publisher: Vertical (US); Bungeishunjū Ltd. (JP)
- Publication date: September 1998
- Publication place: Japan
- English publication date: August 1, 2004
- Media type: Print (Paperback)
- Pages: 288 (US); 415 (JP)
- ISBN: 1932234071 (US); ISBN 4163179208 (JP)

Naoko is a novel by Keigo Higashino. The original title is Himitsu (秘密, Secret). The novel won the 52nd Mystery Writers of Japan Award for Best Novel. The story centers on a man whose wife and daughter are in a terrible accident; the wife dies, but when the daughter wakes up, he discovers his wife's mind inside.

It was made into a 1999 Japanese film, Himitsu, directed by Yōjirō Takita. The 2007 film The Secret is based on the Japanese film.

== Synopsis ==
Heisuke Sugita (杉田 平介, Sugita Heisuke), a humble 39-year-old man, enjoys the smaller pleasures in life. He is devastated when his wife and daughter are involved in a bus accident. Naoko Sugita (杉田 直子 Sugita Naoko), his wife, dies and his 11-year-old daughter Monami Sugita (杉田 藻奈美 Sugita Monami) is badly injured. Monami makes a miraculous recovery—albeit, with one small twist—her personality and memories are that of her mother Naoko's, rather than her own. Both Heisuke and Naoko conclude that her spirit is possessing Monami's body. Unable to explain what has happened, they decide to keep the matter a secret while Naoko lives as Monami from then on.

As Monami's possessed body enters adolescence, Naoko takes the opportunity to live her own unfulfilled dreams. Naoko's growing independence begins to cause a rift between her and Heisuke, who struggles to remain a faithful husband and also tries to make sense of the tragedy that caused Naoko's condition by learning more about the bus driver who caused the accident. Heisuke and Naoko have a falling out when he suspects she has become interested in a boy around Monami's own age, but find they cannot resolve their own relationship as Naoko is now biologically Heisuke's daughter.

When Monami's consciousness begins resurfacing, Heisuke and Naoko are able to repair their relationship as they ensure that Monami and Naoko, now sharing the same body, will be able to function and transition back to the life that Naoko has lived for her. As Monami's consciousness begins to dominate, Heisuke and Naoko eventually part ways forever and Heisuke is content to raise Monami as his daughter again.

Years later, Monami suggests that Naoko's possession was the result of a multiple personality disorder brought on by the accident to help her father cope and gradually went away as her own true personality emerged again. However, on the day that Monami is about to marry, a heartbroken Heisuke suspects that Monami never returned and that Naoko eventually abandoned her identity as Naoko in order for them both to move on in their lives.
