= Into the White Night =

- Film poster
- Directed by: Yoshihiro Fukagawa
- Screenplay by: Yoshihiro Fukagawa; Shingo Irie; Akari Yamamoto
- Based on: Byakuyakō (English title: Journey Under the Midnight Sun) by Keigo Higashino
- Produced by: Hiroyuki Ishigaki
- Starring: Maki Horikita; Kengo Kora
- Cinematography: Hirokazu Ishii
- Edited by: Naoya Bando
- Music by: Mamiko Hirai
- Production companies: Wowow; Horipro; Pony Canyon; The Asahi Shimbun; Image Field
- Distributed by: GAGA Corporation
- Release dates: October 25, 2010 (Tokyo); January 29, 2011 (Japan)
- Running time: 149 minutes
- Country: Japan
- Language: Japanese
- Box office: $4,593,914

Into the White Night (Japanese: 白夜行, Hepburn: Byakuyako) is a 2010 Japanese crime drama film directed by Yoshihiro Fukagawa. It was screened in the Main Programme of the Panorama section at the 61st Berlin International Film Festival. It is based on Journey Under the Midnight Sun by Keigo Higashino.

== Plot ==
A pawn shop owner in Osaka is murdered, but due to a lack of conclusive evidence the police lists the man's death as a suicide. Detective Sasagaki, who investigated the case, can't forget the main suspect's daughter Yukiho (Maki Horikita) and the pawn shop owner's son Ryoji.

As time goes by, more mysterious deaths surround Yukiho and Ryoji. Detective Sasagaki, still unable to let go of the pawn shop owner case, discovers startling details about Yukiho and Ryoji.

== Cast ==
- Maki Horikita as Yukiho Karasawa
- Kengo Kora as Ryoji Kirihara
- Keiko Toda as Yaiko Kirihara
- Tetsushi Tanaka as Isamu Matsuura
- Ayame Koike as Mika Shinozuka
- Eichiro Funakoshi as Junjo Sasagaki
- Nobuo Kyo as Kazunari Shinozuka
- Yurie Midori as Eriko Kawashima
- Urara Awata as Noriko Kurihara
- Yuki Imai as Ryoji Kirihara (10 years old)
- Shiori Fukumoto as Yukiho Nishimoto (10 years old)

== See also ==
- Journey Under the Midnight Sun
- White Night- Korean version of film
