= Keigo Higashino =

Japanese author (1958–2026)

Keigo Higashino 東野 圭吾
- Born: February 4, 1958; Ikuno-ku, Osaka, Osaka Prefecture, Japan
- Died: July 23, 2026 (aged 68); Japan
- Education: Osaka Prefectural Hannan High School
- Alma mater: Osaka Prefecture University
- Occupation: Author
- Writing career
- Period: 1985–2026
- Genres: Mystery fiction, crime fiction, thriller
- Notable works: Naoko; The Devotion of Suspect X; Miracles of the Namiya General Store
- Notable awards: Edogawa Rampo Prize; Mystery Writers of Japan Award; Honkaku Mystery Award; Naoki Prize; Chūōkōron Prize

Keigo Higashino (Japanese: 東野 圭吾, Hepburn: Higashino Keigo; February 4, 1958 – July 23, 2026) was a Japanese author chiefly known for his mystery novels. He served as the 13th President of Mystery Writers of Japan from 2009 to 2013. Higashino won major Japanese awards for his books, almost twenty of which have been turned into films and television series.

== Early life and education ==
Higashino was born in the Ikuno-ku ward of the city of Osaka in Osaka Prefecture. The logographic characters that make up the family name were initially read as "Tono", but Keigo's father changed the reading to "Higashino".

Growing up in a working class area, Higashino's childhood was challenging because of the lower class to which his family belonged. He attended Shoji Elementary School, Higashi Ikuno Junior High School, and Hannan High School. During his high school years he started reading mystery fiction.

He studied Electrical Engineering at Osaka Prefecture University, where he became captain of the archery club. He graduated with a Bachelor of Engineering degree.

== Career ==
Higashino started writing while in high school and university, showing his manuscripts to friends.

In 1981, he began working as an engineer at Nippon Denso Co. (presently DENSO), and married a high school teacher. He continued to write in the evenings and on weekends, submitting unpublished mystery novels for consideration for the annual Edogawa Rampo Prize in 1983. In 1984, his submission, which drew on his wife's occupation, reached the final round. In 1985, at the age of 27, he won the Rampo Prize for best unpublished mystery for Hōkago (放課後; After School), drawing on experiences of the archery club at his former university. He resigned from DENSO in 1986 to start a career in Tokyo as a full-time writer.

In 1998, Higashino published Himitsu (秘密; Secret), which was adapted into a feature film and won the 52nd Mystery Writers of Japan Award for feature films in 1999. Secret was later translated into English by Kerim Yasar and published as Naoko in 2004, with a limited print run. Higashino was inspired to write the story by reading a book in which a young child possessed the memories of someone who died nearby. He tried writing a short story featuring the implications of what would happen in such an instance, "but the ideas didn't fully materialize. Finally I presented it as a novel and it got picked up." A 1999 Japanese film, Himitsu, was based on the book, as was a 2007 English-language French remake, The Secret, starring David Duchovny.

In 2006, Higashino won the 134th Naoki Prize for The Devotion of Suspect X (容疑者Xの献身, Yōgisha Ekkusu no Kenshin), an award for which he had been nominated five times previously. Suspect X also won the 6th Honkaku Mystery Award and was ranked the number-one novel by Kono Mystery ga Sugoi! 2006 and 2006 Honkaku Mystery Best 10, annual mystery fiction guide books published in Japan. The English edition of Suspect X, translated by Alexander O. Smith, was nominated for the 2012 Edgar Award for Best Novel and the 2012 Barry Award for Best First Novel.

He received the Eiji Yoshikawa Literary Prize in 2014 for Inori no Maku ga Oriru Toki (祈りの幕が下りる時; When the Curtain of Prayer Descends), the 10th book (Note: Kaga appears in 9 novels, as well as the short story collection Uso o Mō Hitotsu Dake (嘘をもうひとつだけ; Just One More Lie), 2000.) to feature Detective Kyoichiro Kaga. He thought that the book would be the end of the Kaga series, as he had done what he wanted to do with it.

Higashino was one of the most popular authors in Asia and, reportedly, the most popular novelist in China. Translation rights for his books, like Suspect X, were sold as far afield as China, Thailand, France, Russia and Spain. Both his Suspect X and Salvation of a Saint were published in 6 languages. His popularity drew the attention of Asian academics, with papers and master's theses on his work published in China, Indonesia, Malaysia, and Taiwan, for example, and also stimulated United States scholars.

He was elected president of the Mystery Writers of Japan (MWJ) in 2009, and served until 2013. From 2002 to 2007 he served on various MWJ selection committees, and fulfilled a similar role for the Edogawa Rampo Award from 2008 to 2013. In 2014, he became a selection member for the Naoki Prize.

After the Great East Japan Earthquake of 2011, Higashino donated the royalties of 100,000 copies of the reprint of The Wings of the Kirin (麒麟の翼, Kirin no Tsubasa), the sequel to Newcomer, to relief efforts in affected areas.

Higashino reportedly avoided publicity, as he preferred people not to recognize him on the street.

== Death ==
Higashino died from colorectal cancer on July 23, 2026, at the age of 68. Kodansha, his publisher, announced his death via X. He had a private funeral per his family’s wishes. Condolences were paid via social media by some of the actors who played his characters.

== Contents and style ==
Higashino admitted in 2015 that his content and style had changed from his earlier writings, in which he treated motivation as the most important element. In a 2011 interview, he stated that he wanted his "readers to be continually surprised by my ideas."

In addition to mystery novels, Higashino wrote essays and story books for children. His style of writing the latter differed from his novels, and he did not use as many characters as in his novels. Higashino's works often included scientific elements, such as nuclear power generation and brain transplantation. Sports references, such as archery and kendo, ski jumping, and snowboarding, also occurred often.

Suspect X inverts the classical whodunit structure, as the reader learns early on who the murderer is. Andrew Joyce writes in The Wall Street Journal that Higashino explores how "feelings of loyalty and the oppressive weight of human relations" are "catalysts for murder and dark pacts between neighbors or co-workers to dispose of bodies". Higashino claimed that Japanese people prefer this format, and that rather than explaining the significance of everything at the end of the book, he wanted to describe the characters' actions and intentions at the beginning so he could better portray their feelings of guilt and anguish.

While Higashino admitted to liking Western writers, he felt most strongly influenced by Japanese authors such as Edogawa Rampo and Seicho Matsumoto, "and so my work naturally has that Japanese sense of old-fashioned loyalty and concern for human feeling". Regarding his Western readers, Higashino wanted them "to read my work and come to understand how Japanese people think, love and hate. I want them to be impressed that there is a Japanese person who came up with such unusual stories."

== Honours, awards and nominations ==
=== Honours ===
Year	Honors	Ref.
2023	Medal with Purple Ribbon	

=== Awards ===
List of accolades received by Keigo Higashino
Year	Award	Recipients and nominees	Result
1983	Edogawa Rampo Award	Ningyō-tachi no ie (Dolls' House)	Nominated
1984	Edogawa Rampo Award	Makyū (Magic Ball)	Nominated
1985	Edogawa Rampo Award	Hōkago (After School)	Won
1988	Eiji Yoshikawa Prize	Gakusei-gai no Satsujin (Murder in a College Town)	Nominated
1988	Mystery Writers of Japan Award	Gakusei-gai no Satsujin (Murder in a College Town)	Nominated
1990	Eiji Yoshikawa Prize	Chōjin Keikaku (Plan Chojin)	Nominated
1991	Mystery Writers of Japan Award	Tenshi no Mimi (Angel Ears – short story collection)	Nominated
1992	Mystery Writers of Japan Award	Kagami no Naka de (In the Mirror)	Nominated
1993	Mystery Writers of Japan Award	Aru Tozasareta Yuki no Sansō de (In a Snow-Covered Mansion)	Nominated
1993	Mystery Writers of Japan Award	Kōtsū Keisatsu no Yoru (Night of the Traffic Officer)	Nominated
1996	Eiji Yoshikawa Prize	Tenkū no Hachi (Bee in the Sky)	Nominated
1997	Eiji Yoshikawa Prize	Meitantei no Okite (Rule of the Detective)	Nominated
1999	Eiji Yoshikawa Prize	Himitsu (Secret)	Nominated
1999	Mystery Writers of Japan Award	Himitsu – feature film	Won
2000	Naoki Prize	Byakuyakō (Journey Under the Midnight Sun)	Nominated
2001	Naoki Prize	Kataomoi (One-sided Love)	Nominated
2003	Naoki Prize	Tegami (Letter)	Nominated
2004	Naoki Prize	Genya (Mysterious Night)	Nominated
2006	Naoki Prize	Yōgi-sha X no Kenshin (The Devotion of Suspect X)	Won
2006	Bookstore Grand Prize	Yōgi-sha X no Kenshin (The Devotion of Suspect X)	Nominated
2006	Honkaku Mystery Award	Yōgi-sha X no Kenshin (The Devotion of Suspect X)	Won
2008	New Wind Award	Ryūsei no Kizuna (Bonds of the Shooting Star)	Won
2008	The Selected Book (The Publishers and Booksellers Association of Thailand)	Seijo no Kyūsai (Salvation of a Saint)	Won
2010	Polar Prize, Best International Novel	Mukashi Boku ga Shinda Ie (The Home Where I Once Died; French title: La maison où je suis mort autrefois)	Won
2011	Bookmark Reader Award	Mukashi Boku ga Shinda Ie (The Home Where I Once Died; French title: La maison où je suis mort autrefois)	Won
2012	American Library Association, Best Mystery Novel, Book & Media Awards	The Devotion of Suspect X	Won
2012	Edgar Award	The Devotion of Suspect X	Nominated
2012	Barry Award	The Devotion of Suspect X	Nominated
2012	Chūōkōron Prize	Namiya Zakka-ten no Kiseki (The Miracles of the Namiya General Store)	Won
2013	Shibata Renzaburo Award	Mugen-bana (Dream Flower)	Won
2014	Eiji Yoshikawa Prize	Inori no Maku ga Oriru Toki (The Final Curtain)	Won
2023	Kikuchi Kan Prize	Himself	Won

=== Japanese Mystery Fiction Guide Rankings ===
- 2006 – The Best Japanese Crime Fiction of the Year (Kono Mystery ga Sugoi! 2006): The Devotion of Suspect X
- 2010 – The Best Japanese Crime Fiction of the Year (Kono Mystery ga Sugoi! 2010): Shinzanmono (The Newcomer)
- 2012 – Ranked as the No. 13 novel on the Top 100 Japanese Mystery Novels of All Time: The Devotion of Suspect X
- 2012 – Ranked as the No. 18 novel on the Top 100 Japanese Mystery Novels of All Time: Journey under the Midnight Sun
- 2018 – Ranked as No. 1 novel on the Weekly Bungeishunjū Mystery Best 10: Chinmoku no Parēdo (沈黙のパレード; Silent Parade)

== Bibliography ==
The following is a list of original works by Keigo Higashino.

By 2026, Higashino had published 78 novels, 24 short story collections, four essay collections, one children's book, one manga, and one original audiobook. Selected works have been translated and published in more than 40 countries and territories.

Year	Type	Japanese title	English translation	Series	English publication
1985	Novel	Hōkago (放課後)	After School		
1986	Novel	Hakuba Sansō Satsujin Jiken (白馬山荘殺人事件)	The Murder in Mansion Hakuba		
1986	Novel	Sotsugyō (卒業)	Graduation	Kaga	
1987	Novel	Gakusei-gai no Satsujin (学生街の殺人)	The Murder in the College Town		
1987	Novel	Jūichi Moji no Satsujin (11文字の殺人)	The Case of 11 Letters		
1988	Novel	Makyū (魔球)	Magic Ball		
1988	Novel	Uinku de Kampai (ウインクで乾杯)	Cheers with a Wink		
1988	Short story collection	Naniwa Shōnen Tanteidan (浪花少年探偵団)	Naniwa Detective Boys	Naniwa Detective Boys	
1989	Novel	Jūji Yashiki no Piero (十字屋敷のピエロ)	The Clown of House Juji		
1989	Novel	Chōjin Keikaku (鳥人計画)	Plan Chojin		
1989	Novel	Satsujin Genba wa Kumo no Ue (殺人現場は雲の上)	Murder on the Cloud		
1989	Novel	Burūtasu no Shinzō (ブルータスの心臓)	Heart of Brutus		
1989	Novel	Nemuri no Mori (眠りの森)	The Forest in Sleep	Kaga	
1990	Novel	Shukumei (宿命)	Fate		
1990	Novel	Kamen Sansō Satsujin Jiken (仮面山荘殺人事件)	The Murder in Mansion Masquerade		
1990	Short story collection	Tantei Kurabu (探偵倶楽部)	Detective Club		
1990	Short story collection	Hannin no Inai Satsujin no Yoru (犯人のいない殺人の夜)	A Night of Murder with No Murderer		
1991	Novel	Henshin (変身)	Transformation		
1991	Novel	Kairōtei Satsujin Jiken (回廊亭殺人事件)	The Murder in Kairotei		
1991	Short story collection	Kōtsū Keisatsu no Yoru (交通警察の夜)	A Night of the Traffic Officer		
1992	Novel	Aru Tozasareta Yuki no Sansō de (ある閉ざされた雪の山荘で)	In a Mansion Covered with Snow		
1992	Novel	Utsukushiki Kyōki (美しき凶器)	Beautiful Weapon		
1993	Novel	Dōkyūsei (同級生)	Classmate		
1993	Novel	Bunshin (分身)	Alter Ego		
1993	Short story collection	Shinobu Sense ni Sayonara (しのぶセンセにサヨナラ)	Goodbye, Miss Shinobu	Naniwa Detective Boys	
1994	Novel	Mukashi Boku ga Shinda Ie (むかし僕が死んだ家)	The Home Where I Died		
1994	Novel	Niji o Ayatsuru Shōnen (虹を操る少年)	The Boy Who Controlled the Rainbow		
1994	Short story collection	Ayashii Hitobito (怪しい人びと)	Suspicious People		
1995	Novel	Parareru Wārudo Rabu Sutōrī (パラレルワールド・ラブストーリー)	Parallel World Love Story		
1995	Novel	Tenkū no Hachi (天空の蜂)	The Bee in the Sky		
1995	Essay collection	Anogoro Bokuraha Ahodeshita (あの頃僕らはアホでした)	When We Were Stupid		
1995	Short story collection	Kaishō Shōsetsu (怪笑小説)	Weird Laughs Novel	Warai Shosetsu	
1996	Novel	Dochiraka ga Kanojo o Koroshita (どちらかが彼女を殺した)	Who Killed Her	Kaga	
1996	Novel	Akui (悪意)	Malice	Kaga	Minotaur Books (2011)
1996	Short story collection	Meitantei no Okite (名探偵の掟)	The Rule of the Detective	Daigoro Tenkaichi	
1996	Novel	Meitantei no Jubaku (名探偵の呪縛)	The Curse of the Detective	Daigoro Tenkaichi	
1996	Short story collection	Dokushō Shōsetsu (毒笑小説)	Poisonous Laughs Novel	Warai Shosetsu	
1998	Short story collection	Tantei Galileo (探偵ガリレオ)	Detective Galileo	Galileo	
1998	Novel	Himitsu (秘密)	Naoko		Vertical (2004)
1999	Novel	Byakuyakō (白夜行)	Journey Under the Midnight Sun		Minotaur Books (2016)
1999	Novel	Watashi ga Kare o Koroshita (私が彼を殺した)	I Killed Him	Kaga	
2000	Short story collection	Uso o Mō Hitotsu Dake (嘘をもうひとつだけ)	Just One More Lie	Kaga	
2000	Short story collection	Yochimu (予知夢)	Foresight Dream	Galileo	
2001	Novel	Kataomoi (片想い)	One-sided Love		
2001	Short story collection	Chō Satsujin Jiken: Suiri Sakka no Kunō (超・殺人事件 推理作家の苦悩)	Super-Murder: The Anguish of the Mystery Writers		
2001	Children's book	Santa no Obasan (サンタのおばさん)			
2002	Novel	Reikusaido (レイクサイド)	Lakeside		
2002	Novel	Tokio (時生)	Tokio		
2002	Novel	Gēmu no Na wa Yūkai (ゲームの名は誘拐)	The Name of the Game is a Kidnapping		Vertical (2017)
2003	Manga	HE∀DS	Heads		
2003	Novel	Tegami (手紙)	Letter		
2003	Novel	Ore wa Hijōkin (おれは非情勤)	I'm the Ruthless Teacher		
2003	Novel	Satsujin no Mon (殺人の門)	The Door of Murder		
2004	Novel	Gen'ya (幻夜)	Mysterious Night		
2004	Novel	Samayou Yaiba (さまよう刃)	The Hesitating Blade		
2004	Essay collection	Charenji? (ちゃれんじ?)	Challenge?		
2005	Novel	Yōgisha X no Kenshin (容疑者Xの献身)	The Devotion of Suspect X	Galileo	Minotaur Books (2011)
2005	Essay collection	Sai Ensu? (さいえんす?)	Science?		
2005	Short story collection	Kokushō Shōsetsu (黒笑小説)	Dark Laughs Novel	Warai Shosetsu	
2006	Novel	Shimei to Tamashii no Rimitto (使命と魂のリミット)	The Limit of Mission and Heart		
2006	Novel	Akai Yubi (赤い指)	The Red Finger	Kaga	
2006	Essay collection	Yume wa Torino o Kakemeguru (夢はトリノをかけめぐる)	Dreams over Turin		
2007	Novel	Yoake no Machi de (夜明けの街で)	The Street Where the Dawn Breaks		
2007	Novel	Daiingu Ai (ダイイング・アイ)	Dying Eye		
2007	Essay collection	Tabun Saigo no Go Aisatsu (たぶん最後の御挨拶)	Probably the Last Greeting		
2008	Short story collection	Galileo no Kunō (ガリレオの苦悩)	The Anguish of Galileo	Galileo	
2008	Novel	Seijo no Kyūsai (聖女の救済)	Salvation of a Saint	Galileo	Minotaur Books (2012)
2008	Novel	Ryūsei no Kizuna (流星の絆)	The Bonds of the Shooting Star		
2009	Novel	Paradokkusu Sātīn (パラドックス13)	Paradox 13		
2009	Novel	Shinzanmono (新参者)	Newcomer	Kaga	Minotaur Books (2018)
2010	Novel	Kakkō no Tamago wa Dare no Mono (カッコウの卵は誰のもの)	Whose Cuckoo Eggs		
2010	Novel	Purachina Dēta (プラチナデータ)	Platinum Data		
2010	Novel	Hakugin Jakku (白銀ジャック)	Silver Jack	Snow Mountain	
2011	Novel	Manatsu no Hōteishiki (真夏の方程式)	A Midsummer's Equation	Galileo	Minotaur Books (2015)
2011	Novel	Kirin no Tsubasa (麒麟の翼)	A Death in Tokyo	Kaga	Minotaur Books (2014)
2011	Novel	Masukarēdo Hoteru (マスカレード・ホテル)	Masquerade Hotel	Masquerade	
2011	Short story collection	Ano Koro no Dareka (あの頃の誰か)	Someone of Those Days		
2012	Short story collection	Kyozō no Dōkeshi (虚像の道化師)	The Virtual Clown	Galileo	
2012	Novel	Namiya Zakkaten no Kiseki (ナミヤ雑貨店の奇蹟)	The Miracles of the Namiya General Store		Yen Press (2019)
2012	Short story collection	Waishō Shōsetsu (歪笑小説)	Crooked Laughs Novel	Warai Shosetsu	
2012	Short story collection	Kindan no Majutsu (禁断の魔術)	Forbidden Magic	Galileo	
2013	Novel	Mugen-bana (夢幻花)	Dream Flower		
2013	Novel	Inori no Maku ga Oriru Toki (祈りの幕が下りる時)	The Final Curtain	Kaga	Minotaur Books (2019)
2013	Novel	Shippū Rondo (疾風ロンド)	Whirlwind Rondo	Snow Mountain	
2014	Novel	Utsuro na Jūjika (虚ろな十字架)	Hollow Cross		
2014	Short story collection	Masukarēdo Ibu (マスカレード・イブ)	Masquerade Eve	Masquerade	
2015	Novel	Ningyo no Nemuru Ie (人魚の眠る家)	The House Where the Mermaid Sleeps		
2015	Novel	Rapurasu no Majo (ラプラスの魔女)	Laplace's Witch	Laplace's Witch	Yen Press (2026)
2016	Novel	Kiken'na Bīnasu (危険なビーナス)	Dangerous Venus		
2016	Novel	Sekien Chase (雪煙チェイス)	Snow Chase	Snow Mountain	
2016	Short story collection	Koi no Gondola (恋のゴンドラ)	Love Gondola	Snow Mountain	
2017	Novel	Masukarēdo Naito (マスカレード・ナイト)	Masquerade Night	Masquerade	
2018	Novel	Chinmoku no Parēdo (沈黙のパレード)	Silent Parade	Galileo	Minotaur Books (2022)
2018	Short story collection	Maryoku no Taidō (魔力の胎動)	The Stirring of Magic	Laplace's Witch	
2019	Novel	Kibō no Ito (希望の糸)	Thread of Hope	Kaga	
2020	Novel	Kusunoki no Bannin (クスノキの番人)	The Keeper of the Camphor Tree	Camphor Tree	Abacus (2026)
2020	Novel	Black Showman to Na mo Naki Machi no Satsujin (ブラック・ショーマンと名もなき町の殺人)	The Dark Magician	Black Showman	Tuttle (2026)
2021	Novel	Tōmei na Rasen (透明な螺旋)	Invisible Helix	Galileo	Minotaur Books (2024)
2021	Novel	Hakuchō to Kōmori (白鳥とコウモリ)	Guilt	Detective Godai	Minotaur Books (2025)
2022	Novel	Masukarēdo Gēmu (マスカレード・ゲーム)	Masquerade Game	Masquerade	
2023	Novel	Majo to Sugoshita Nanokakan (魔女と過ごした七日間)	Seven Days with the Witch	Laplace's Witch	
2023	Novel	Anata ga Dareka o Koroshita (あなたが誰かを殺した)	You Killed Someone	Kaga	
2024	Audiobook	Dareka ga Watashi o Koroshita (誰かが私を殺した)	Someone Killed Me	Kaga	
2024	Short story collection	Black Showman to Kakusei Suru Onna-tachi (ブラック・ショーマンと覚醒する女たち)	Black Showman and the Awakening Women	Black Showman	
2024	Novel	Kusunoki no Megami (クスノキの女神)	The Goddess of the Camphor Tree	Camphor Tree	
2024	Novel	Kakūhan (架空犯)	Imaginary Criminal	Detective Godai	
2025	Novel	Masukarēdo Raifu (マスカレード・ライフ)	Masquerade Life	Masquerade	
2026	Short story collection	Chiisana Koi no Monogatari (小さな故意の物語)	Little Stories of Intentional Coincidence		
2026	Novel	Eien no Kioku (永遠の記憶)	Eternal Memory	Galileo	

== Television and film adaptations ==
Some of his novels have been made into TV drama series and films:

=== Japanese films ===
- Naoko (1999, Original Title: Himitsu, 1998)
- g@me. (2003, Original Title: Gēmu no Na wa Yūkai, 2002)
- Lakeside Murder Case (2004, Original Title: Lakeside, 2002)
- Henshin (2005)
- Tegami (2006)
- Suspect X (2008)
- The Hovering Blade (2009, Original Title: Samayou Yaiba, 2004)
- Into the White Night (2011)
- Yoake no Machi de (2011)
- The Wings of the Kirin (2012)
- Platinum Data (2013)
- Midsummer's Equation (2013)
- Broken | Banghwanghaneun Kalnal (2014)
- The Big Bee | Tenku no Hachi (2015)
- Shippu Rondo (2016)
- Miracles of the Namiya General Store | Namiya Zakkaten no Kiseki (2017)
- The House Where The Mermaid Sleeps | Ningyo no Nemuru Ie (2018)
- The Crimes That Bind | Inori no Maku ga Oriru Toki (2018)
- Laplace's Witch | Rapurasu no Majo (2018)
- Masquerade Hotel (2019)
- Parallel World Love Story (2019)
- Masquerade Night (2021)
- Silent Parade (2022)
- In an Isolated Cottage on a Snowy Mountain (2024)
- Black Showman (2025)
- The Keeper of the Camphor Tree (2026)
- Guilt (2026)
- The Gate of Murder (2027)

=== Japanese television dramas ===
- Tokio chichi e no dengon (2004 Aug–Sep, Original Title: Tokio, 2002)
- Byakuyakō (2006)
- Galileo (2007 and 2008, Original Title: Tantei Galileo, 1998, Yochimu, 2000, and Galileo no Kunō, 2008)
- Ryūsei no Kizuna (2008)
- Meitantei no Okite (2009)
- Himitsu (2010)
- Shinzanmono (2010)
- Higashino Keigo Mysteries (2012, Original Title: Hannin no Inai Satsujin no Yoru, 1990, Ayashii Hitobito, 1994, and Ano Koro no Dareka, 2011)
- Galileo II (2013 and SP, 2013, Original Title: Seijo no Kyūsai, 2008, Galileo no Kunō, 2008, Kyozō no Dōkeshi, 2012, and Kindan no Majutsu, 2012)
- Dangerous Venus (2020)
- The Forbidden Magic (2022)

=== South Korean films ===
- White Night (2009)
- Perfect Number (2012)
- Broken (2014)

=== French films ===
- The Secret (2007, based on Himitsu; French title: Si J'etais Toi, meaning "If I Were You")

=== Chinese films ===
- Namiya (2017, based on Namiya Zakkaten no Kiseki)

=== Indian films ===
- Monica, O My Darling (2022, Hindi-language film based on Burutasu No Shinzou)
- Jaane Jaan (2023, Hindi-language film based on The Devotion of Suspect X )

== See also ==
- Japanese detective fiction
