= Tora-san's Promise =

- Theatrical poster
- Directed by: Yoji Yamada
- Written by: Yoji Yamada; Yoshitaka Asama
- Starring: Kiyoshi Atsumi; Mikiko Otonashi
- Cinematography: Tetsuo Takaba
- Edited by: Iwao Ishii
- Music by: Naozumi Yamamoto
- Distributed by: Shochiku
- Release date: December 28, 1981
- Running time: 101 minutes
- Country: Japan
- Language: Japanese

Tora-san's Promise (男はつらいよ 寅次郎紙風船, Otoko wa Tsurai yo: Torajirō Kamifūsen), also called Torasan and a Paper Balloon in some regions, is a 1981 Japanese comedy film directed by Yoji Yamada. It stars Kiyoshi Atsumi as Torajirō Kuruma (Tora-san), and Mikiko Otonashi as his love interest or "Madonna". Tora-san's Promise is the twenty-eighth entry in the popular, long-running Otoko wa Tsurai yo series.

== Synopsis ==
Tora-san returns to his family's home to attend an elementary school class reunion. After he embarrasses himself by getting drunk and insulting all his ex-classmates, he resumes his travels. In Kyushu he meets an outspoken 18-year-old girl who becomes enamored of Tora-san and follows him around. One of Tora-san's old friends is terminally ill and makes Tora-san promise him to marry his wife once he is gone.

== Cast ==
- Kiyoshi Atsumi as Torajirō
- Chieko Baisho as Sakura
- Mikiko Otonashi as Mitsue Kuratomi
- Kayoko Kishimoto as Aiko Odajima
- Shimojo Masami as Kuruma Tatsuzō
- Chieko Misaki as Tsune Kuruma (Torajiro's aunt)
- Hiroshi Inuzuka as Shigeru
- Gin Maeda as Hiroshi Suwa
- Takeo Chii as Kenkichi Odajima
- Hidetaka Yoshioka as Mitsuo Suwa
- Hisao Dazai as Boss (Umetarō Katsura)

== Critical appraisal ==
Stuart Galbraith IV writes that Tora-san's Promise is a middle-quality entry in the Otoko wa Tsurai yo series, though the series has a high standard. The German-language site molodezhnaja gives Tora-san's Promise three and a half out of five stars.

== Availability ==
Tora-san's Promise was released theatrically on December 28, 1981. In Japan, the film was released on videotape in 1986 and 1996, and in DVD format in 2002 and 2008.

== Bibliography ==
=== English ===
- "OTOKO WA TSURAI YO TORAJIRO KAMIFUSEN (1981)". British Film Institute. Archived from the original on 2012-10-17.
- "OTOKO WA TSURAIYO -TORAJIRO KAMIFUSEN". Complete Index to World Film.
- Otoko wa tsurai yo: Torajiro kamifusen (1981) at IMDb
- Galbraith IV, Stuart (2007-04-03). "Tora-san 28: Tora-san's Promise (Region 3)". DVD Talk.

=== German ===
- "Tora-San's Promise" (in German). www.molodezhnaja.ch.

=== Japanese ===
- 男はつらいよ 寅次郎紙風船 (1981) (in Japanese). allcinema.net.
- "男はつらいよ 寅次郎紙風船". Japanese Cinema Database (Agency for Cultural Affairs). Archived from the original on 2014-03-05.
- 男はつらいよ 寅次郎紙風船 (in Japanese). Japanese Movie Database.
- 男はつらいよ 寅次郎紙風船 (in Japanese). Kinema Junpo. Archived from the original on 2012-03-09.
