= Yurie Omi =

Japanese former announcer and news anchor

- 近江 友里恵
- Born: July 26, 1988 (age 37); Kochi Prefecture, Japan
- Education: Waseda University
- Occupations: former announcer; former television reporter; former television personality; former news anchor
- Years active: 2012–2021
- Employer: NHK (2012–2021)
- Television: Asaichi anchor (2018–2021); Bura Tamori co-host (2016–2018); NHK News Ohayō Nippon newscaster (2016–2018)
- Spouse: Undisclosed (m. 2019)

Yurie Omi (近江 友里恵, Ōmi Yurie; born July 26, 1988) is a Japanese former announcer and news anchor for NHK. She left NHK in March 2021. She was famous for being the co-host of NHK's morning talk show Asaichi as well as its geographical television series Bura Tamori.

== Early years ==
Omi was born in Kochi Prefecture, Japan and raised in Tokyo, Japan. Her father is a police officer. Her younger brother is a doctor.

The beginning of Omi's media experience was early. At age 10, she joined Yomiuri Shimbun as a child journalist. She was involved in researching school-related topics and writing short columns on the newspaper until she was an 11th grader. Although her team members consisted of only those ranging from elementary school children to high school students, they did most of the tasks by themselves. They faxed presentation papers to parties, made appointments with the people they needed to interview to get necessary information, and wrote whole stories about what they investigated. During her membership, she interviewed Japanese tennis pro Kimiko Date and members of Shiki Theatre Company, one of Japan's most prominent musical troupes.

When she attended junior high school, she joined the school broadcasting club to try to improve her speech skills since she felt not being a good public speaker at that time. Her experience in this club gave her the confidence to make a speech in public. When she was a high school student, she won with teammates of the broadcasting club an award of the 52nd NHK Cup National High School Broadcasting Contest in 2005.

== Education ==
In March 2012, Omi received the bachelor's degree from Waseda University in Tokyo. Her major was political science, and her researches included sport and city planning. She studied at Public Policy Research Seminar, or PPRS, the laboratory run by Koichiro Agata. Her university friends said that she was, far from a shallow wannabe anchorwoman, at the top of PPRS consisting of such students that were hoping to be big-name company employees or top-notch consultants.

Although she was a cheerleader of the university for the first year of her college life, she gave up the cheerleading activities because of her wish to focus on studying.

She traveled alone around Beijing, China for a month as she said she loved China and Chinese culture.

== Career ==
During college, Omi experienced an internship at TV-Asahi Ask Co. Ltd. She was an assistant presenter starring some TV news programs of Asahi Newstar news channel.

=== NHK ===
In April 2012, Omi was hired by NHK as Announcer. After few months' training, she started her broadcasting career as an occasional reporter at NHK Kumamoto Broadcasting Station in Kumamoto, Japan.

In 2014, Omi moved to NHK Fukuoka Broadcasting Station in Fukuoka, Japan. From the spring of 2015, she was an anchor of NHK Fukuoka's afternoon news show Rokuichi Fukuoka. She also appeared as an occasional newscaster on NHK News airing at noon within the Kyushu area as well as the nationwide morning news show NHK News Ohayō Nippon and the evening news show News Watch 9.

On January 17, 2015, Omi made a trip to Tokyo to be an occasional anchor for that day's NHK News Ohayō Nippon. She appeared in place of its main anchor Mayuko Wakuda, who was in Kobe for reporting the 20th anniversary of the Great Hanshin-Awaji Earthquake.

=== Bura Tamori ===
In March 2016, Omi was appointed as the 4th assistant for NHK's geographical program Bura Tamori hosted by Tamori. The producer of this program called her to Arashiyama, Kyoto for the filming of her first episode of it, which aired on April 30, 2016.

Omi moved to Tokyo since she was officially relocated to NHK Tokyo Announcement Room in April 2016.

She served 65 episodes of Bura Tamori for two years from April 2016 to March 2018. Her girlish looks and goofy, empty-minded behavior attracted some of its viewers and contributed to this program's higher viewership. The highest viewership rate of all episodes is 16.0%, which was marked by the "Kyoto · Fushimi" episode aired on May 7, 2016.

The weekly Shūkan Bunshun magazine nominated Omi the 15th most favorite female announcer in 2017 and the 9th most favorite one in 2018 based on reader's polls. It introduced its reader's voices, saying, "Her goofiness is cute. Tamori and she look like a grandfather and a granddaughter," "She looks sincere," and "She looks pure."

In the "Yokosuka" episode of Bura Tamori (aired on June 18, 2016), Omi visited the Command Fleet Activities Yokosuka in Yokosuka, Kanagawa Prefecture together with the co-host Tamori. They went on board USS Ronald Reagan anchoring there to interview this aircraft carrier's crew members.

Before filming the "Hiraizumi" episode (aired on December 10, 2016), Omi injured her chin and got stitches on it because she accidentally fell on the street. She appeared in this episode with her chin covered with a big bandage, which surprised viewers of this episode.

On September 30, 2017, Omi made a presentation in Nagoya to the viewers of Bura Tamori and her programs, talking what she was about, in-depth explanation of Bura Tamori's episodes in Nagoya (airing in June 2017), how these episodes were made, what the hardships in making these episodes were, and what the lessons she had learned from Tamori and the program production team were.

Omi resigned from Bura Tamori in March 2018. Before leaving it, she wrapped up her work in NHK Weekly Stera magazine, saying that this program had changed her a lot. "In the beginning, I wasn't interested in anything about geology, so I wasn't acquainted with terms frequently used in this program.

"For two years, I got to know a lot about kinds of rocks and stones, terrain features, and geologic stratum. Now, these are very familiar to me. I even look at a curling stone and say, 'Oh, that's made of granite, isn't it?'

"I learned from Tamori what life was about. He taught me that human's distress is a small thing compared to earth's long history. I noticed the meaninglessness of forcing myself to change myself and the importance of staying the way I am."

=== NHK News Ohayō Nippon ===
In April 2016, she was appointed as a general assignment navigator for a corner on NHK News Ohayō Nippon. She served one year as a navigator for the "Machikado Jōhōshitsu (Street Information Room)" segment, where she introduced inventions that helped make people's life more convenient.

On June 20, 2016, Omi appeared at the studio of "Machikado Jōhōshitsu", having her clothes on back to front. Neither she nor any other on-air staff members noticed the mistake at that time, but after the broadcast was over, one viewer pointed it out on Twitter and it was spread out online. NHK spokesman then admitted the mistake and said as a formal apology, "She said she carelessly had done it. She will try to wear clothes more carefully from now on." This caused no backlashes, but instead, this human mistake helped her attract much more viewers than before.

On April 10, 2017, Omi became a weekday newscaster for NHK News Ohayō Nippon (hosted by Kozo Takase and Mayuko Wakuda). She appeared biweekly from 5 am to 7 am JST.

From September 19 through 29, 2017, and from January 29 through February 2, 2018, she hosted this program as an occasional main anchor from 6 am to 8 am in place of Wakuda, who took leave in that period.

In the midnight of January 1, 2018, Omi appeared on TV as a correspondent at Kawasaki Daishi in Yukutoshi Kurutoshi, NHK's annual New Year's Eve television special, with Takase and Wakuda.

In addition to the newscaster, Omi temporarily hosted NHK Special. Her first appearance on this program was the panel discussion segment on March 26, 2017, with Tamio Miyake. In NHK Special airing on January 1, 2019, Omi hosted this program with Tamori in a similar way she did in Bura Tamori. In this program, she invited an architect Kengo Kuma and a novelist Yukiko Motoya as guests for looking back how the city of Tokyo has been developed, viewing what the construction of the venues for Olympic Games to be held in 2020 is going on, and discussing how people should live their lives in the future. She also hosted the episodes aired on March 24 and August 10, 2019. From November 24, 2019 to February 23, 2020, Omi hosted a series of "Origin of Food" with Tokio.

Omi narrated railroad travel series Ikuzo! Saihate! Hikyo x Tetsudo, as well as some episodes of Sawayaka Shizen Hyakkei, the documentaries with factual content involving nature of a particular place in Japan.

Omi visited Sicily, Italy as a one-time navigator to film her six-day walk of the ancient Sicilian footpath from San Leone to Sutera for the last episode of documentary Ippon-no-Michi aired on NHK BS Premium on March 20, 2018.

=== Asaichi ===
Omi left Bura Tamori and NHK News Ohayō Nippon in March 2018. In April, she became the co-host of Asaichi, a live infotainment morning talk show, with comedians Hanamaru-Daikichi Hakata, taking over from Yumiko Udo, Yoshihiko Inohara and Hideo Yanagisawa. At the same time, she conducted a panel discussion by people with a developmental disability as one of the main hosts of NHK's special program with Hideyuki Nakayama, which aired on April 30, 2018.

At the beginning of September 2018, Omi, together with Mayuko Wakuda, conducted an exclusive interview with Namie Amuro, one of Japan's leading pop singers who was planning to end her musical career on September 16, 2018. This interview aired in Asaichi on September 12, 2018.

In Asaichi airing on July 4, 2019, Omi introduced the viral video where she had visited Showa Women's University Junior High School, which she had attended in her teenage years, to interview Tadashi Sahara, a 94-year-old ex-science teacher of the school who had taught her. He talked in this interview how he had lived his tough life during World War II.

On July 19, 2019, Omi and Hakatas conducted a live interview with Hiroshi Kume, legendary radio personality and former anchor for News Station in TV Asahi who had been critical of NHK. While Kume blistered NHK severely in the interview, saying, "I think NHK should turn into a private broadcasting company. It should be an independent broadcasting organization. There shouldn't be such a broadcasting station that is got by the balls by the state with its power on personnel affairs and budget. Such a thing should never happen in a developed country," Omi talked back to him on behalf of NHK, saying, "You're saying NHK is got by the balls by the state. However, I'm in an independent public broadcasting station. It's not state-run broadcasting. I'll do my best, for not playing up to anybody." The next day when Kume was talking on his radio program about the progress of Asaichi on the day before, Omi sent an email to the radio station incognito, saying that she was ashamed to be aggressive to him, just like a chihuahua barking at a bigger Doberman. Kume praised her polite and sincere attitude and said in his program, "She has impressed me favorably since she appeared in Bura Tamori. She is cute and is faithful to her job. I want to invite her to this program. I'm afraid she won't come here, though."

On August 7, 2019, Omi was a temporary host for primetime health program Gatten! in place of its regular presenters Shinosuke Tatekawa and Fumie Ono. It was the first time in 17 years that she appeared in this program. She was just a junior high school student when she appeared in the program airing on November 26, 2002, as one of the examinees.

In October 2019, Omi conducted an interview with Catherine Deneuve, Juliette Binoche and Hirokazu Kore-eda, who starred and directed the film The Truth selected as the opening film at the 76th Venice International Film Festival. This interview was broadcast in Asaichi on October 21.

Not only did Omi star on TV programs, but she sometimes appeared on websites run by NHK. On the website encouraging viewers to write down on a hearing sheet some of their characteristics that bother them in their daily lives and that they want to share with others to ask for help, she was filmed filling in the form. She said in the hearing sheet that she was not a morning person, that she did not like parties and crowded places, and that she was forgetful. In March 2020, Omi appeared on the website, having a mock job interview with her boss through a teleconferencing gear to give job-seeking college students some advice on how to succeed in online job interviews.

On August 31, 2019, Omi made a presentation at NHK Culture Center in Tokyo to the viewers of Asaichi. In the presentation, she showed every day's schedule to get things done, spoke about what she had learned from this program and her past ones, shared the audience with what were impressive words by guests, reviewed what themes of this program had great responses by viewers, and expressed what she wanted to aim for through this program in the future as its host.

In February 2021, Omi announced on Asaichi that she would be stepping down her post as co-host of Asaichi in March and leaving NHK, where she had worked for nine years. She told the viewers of Asaichi that it was because she had some new things she wanted to learn and said that she would try something other than being an announcer. She denied being a housewife or a freelance announcer.

Her last live appearance on TV was the interview with Muro Tsuyoshi on the "Premium Talk" segment of Asaichi, which aired on March 5, 2021. She told the viewers that she would be involved in city planning after her retirement from NHK. She said at the end of the broadcast,

I originally like to see buildings. I walked around places nationwide in Bura Tamori. I've learned how to prevent or reduce disasters through reporting at disaster scenes. I've found out a lot of life hacks in Asaichi. I'm sure these experiences will help contribute to creating good cities in return for people's kindness.

Satoru Masagaki, NHK's Executive Director of Broadcasting, referred to Omi in NHK's regular press conference on March 24, saying:

Her plain, well-disposed character has aroused viewers' sympathy and contributed to expanding the range of programs. I strongly appreciate it. I hear she's trying a job other than an announcer. I'm sure she'll do a great job with her smile and vitality.

In April 2021, Omi was hired by Mitsui Fudosan and started her new career as a city planner.

== Publication ==
In December 2017, NHK Publishing published a textbook Kotobaryoku Up (meaning Brushing Up Your Language Skills) where what Omi had spoken on NHK Radio was written. She said on the radio that one of the most important attitudes she kept in mind in her job was that she tried not to be easily convinced. She said that she dared not to use the Japanese word naruhodo (meaning "I understand." or "That explains it.") when in the filming of Bura Tamori an expert was explaining something to Tamori and her. She said that it was because if she said so, the conversation would stop immediately since he or she would have no more words to say, and it was a significant loss of a chance to hear further interesting information from the expert.

== Personal life ==
Omi's favorite foods include fruits, chocolates, and grilled beef. She likes strolling in the town. She says that her favorites are eating gummy candies and starch syrup, playing the electric organ, Tahitian dance, and collecting iron sand with a magnet. She also likes bread and rakugo.

In addition, she likes learning Chinese language, playing the ukulele, and spectating pro wrestling. She said that Mitsuo Momota, Yo-Hey, and Great Muta were her most impressive wrestlers.

Omi is a Japanese calligrapher, having obtained the 6th dan.

Daily Shincho reported on May 20, 2020, that Omi had registered her marriage on May 1, 2019, with a producer of NHK who was 15 years her senior. She and her husband are joint owners of a three-story house near NHK Broadcasting Center in Tokyo, and she currently resides in it alone because he was relocated to NHK Sendai Broadcasting Station in Sendai.

== See also ==
- Tamori
- Yumiko Udo
- Hanamaru-Daikichi Hakata

Media offices
Preceded by Maho Kuwako	Bura Tamori 4th Co-Host; 2016–2018	Succeeded by Risa Hayashida
Preceded by Yumiko Udo	Asaichi Anchor; 2018–2021	Succeeded by Naoko Suzuki
