= The Killing Vote =

2023 South Korean television series

- Promotional poster
- Hangul: 국민사형투표
- Hanja: 國民死刑投票
- Lit.: National Death Penalty Vote
- RR: Gungmin sahyeong tupyo
- MR: Kungmin sahyŏng t'up'yo
- Genre: Hardboiled; Thriller; Crime
- Based on: National Death Penalty Vote by Uhm Se-yoon and Jung Yi-pum
- Written by: Jo Yoon-young
- Directed by: Park Shin-woo
- Starring: Park Hae-jin; Park Sung-woong; Lim Ji-yeon
- Music by: Koo Ja-wan
- Country of origin: South Korea
- Original language: Korean
- No. of episodes: 12

Production
- Executive producers: Lee Seul-gi (CP); Jeon Su-jeong; Kim Eun-mi
- Producers: Han Jeong-hwan; Kim Hee-yeol; Park Sang-hyun
- Production companies: Pan Entertainment; Studio S
- Budget: ₩15.36 billion

Original release
- Network: SBS TV
- Release: August 10 – November 16, 2023

The Killing Vote (Korean: 국민사형투표; lit. 'National Death Penalty Vote') is a 2023 South Korean television series starring Park Hae-jin, Park Sung-woong, and Lim Ji-yeon. It is based on a popular webtoon of the same Korean title serialized on Kakao Webtoon and KakaoPage. It aired on SBS TV from August 10 to November 16, 2023, every Thursday at 21:00 (KST) for 12 episodes. It is also available for streaming on Amazon Prime Video in selected regions.

== Synopsis ==
The series follows a mysterious figure known as Gaetal, (Note: Gaetal (개탈) means "dog mask" in Korean.) who conducts surveys via text message to decide whether to put certain vicious criminals to death, then murders them if more than fifty percent of those who respond favor a death sentence.

== Cast ==
=== Main ===
- Park Hae-jin as Kim Moo-chan: the head of Team 1 of Southern Provincial Police Agency's regional investigation unit.
- Park Sung-woong as Kwon Seok-joo: a long-term prison inmate who turned himself in after personally killing the rapist of his eight-year-old daughter.
- Lim Ji-yeon as Joo Hyeon: a five-year police officer at the Cyber Safety Bureau of Seoul Metropolitan Police Agency (SMPA).

=== Supporting ===
==== People around Moo-chan ====
- Shin Jung-geun as Choi Jin-soo: a twenty-year veteran police officer and Moo-chan's partner.
- Go Geon-han as Kim Jordan: Hyeon's colleague who is an inspector at the Cyber Safety Bureau of SMPA.
- Oh Ha-nee as Kang Yoon-ji: a police officer and a former national taekwondo athlete.
- Kwon Do-hyung as Ban Sang-jae: a member of the Special Investigation Headquarters.

==== People around Seok-joo ====
- Kim Yoo-mi as Min Ji-young: a member of the National Assembly who becomes the next presidential candidate.
- Kim Kwon as Lee Min-soo: a high school teacher.
- Cha Rae-hyung as Park Chul-min: a prison guard at Cheongnang Prison.

==== People around Joo Hyeon ====
- Choi Yu-hwa as Chae Do-hee: a journalist-turned-host.
- Kwon Ah-reum as Joo Min: Hyeon's younger sister who is a third-year high school student.
- Seo Young-joo as Kim Ji-hoon: a high school student who lost his parents in an accident as a child.
- Oh Ji-hye as Yang Hye-jin: Ji-hoon's grandmother who is an internal medicine doctor.

=== Extended ===
- Gong Do-eun as Hye-mi: Min's best friend.
- Chae Ri-eun as Ji-young's secretary.
- Ahn Young-hoon as Byun Woo-taek
- Lee Wan as Jung Jin-wook - he is a former Special Army. His fiancé was the victim of sexual harassment by Captian/ Dr. Oh, who is on Gaetal's List.

=== Killing Vote Targets ===
- Kim Min-sik as Bae Gi-cheol: a vicious criminal who has around 200,000 cases of sexual exploitation of minors.
- Jeong Hae-na as Eum Eun-kyeong: a serial killer who killing three husbands and abuse the kids.
- Kim Jung-heon as Oh Jeong-ho: a doctor and a former army captain.

=== Special appearances ===
- Jung Woong-in as Kang Seok-joo
- Hong Jong-hyun as a mysterious man
- Ji Yi-soo as Drunk driver

== Production ==
In March 2023, production company Pan Entertainment announced that it had signed a supply contract with Studio S for the production of the series worth 15.36 billion won.

== Release ==
Originally, the series was scheduled to broadcast the first two episodes consecutively on August 10, 2023 from 21:00 (KST). However, the broadcast of the first episode was postponed to 22:10 (KST) due to a special news report about Typhoon Khanun. Hence, the second episode aired on August 17.

== Viewership ==
The Killing Vote : South Korea viewers per episode (thousands)

Season	Episode number												Average
Season	1	2	3	4	5	6	7	8	9	10	11	12	Average
1	844	690	794	759	620	720	600	606	559	594	659	556	667

Source: Audience measurement performed nationwide by Nielsen Korea.

Average TV viewership ratings
Ep.	Original broadcast date	Average audience share		
Ep.	Original broadcast date	Nielsen Korea		TNmS
Ep.	Original broadcast date	Nationwide	Seoul	Nationwide
1	August 10, 2023	4.1% (13th)	4.1% (11th)	N/A
2	August 17, 2023	3.8% (13th)	3.9% (10th)	3.4% (17th)
3	August 24, 2023	4.1% (11th)	4.0% (9th)	N/A
4	August 31, 2023	4.1% (11th)	4.3% (9th)	3.1% (19th)
5	September 7, 2023	3.4% (14th)	3.1% (15th)	N/A
6	September 14, 2023	4.1% (12th)	4.4% (9th)	N/A
7	September 21, 2023	3.1% (15th)	3.0% (14th)	2.7% (20th)
8	October 12, 2023	2.8% (18th)	3.2% (16th)	N/A
9	October 19, 2023	2.7% (21st)	3.0% (17th)	N/A
10	October 26, 2023	3.2% (17th)	3.2% (16th)	2.9% (19th)
11	November 9, 2023	3.3% (17th)	3.7% (12th)	N/A
12	November 16, 2023	3.1% (16th)	2.9% (18th)	N/A
Average		3.5%	3.5%	— (Note: Due to multiple unpublished ratings, the exact average rating is unknown.)
In the table above, the blue numbers represent the lowest ratings and the red numbers represent the highest ratings.; N/A denotes ratings that were not published.

== Awards and nominations ==
Name of the award ceremony, year presented, category, nominee of the award, and the result of the nomination
Award ceremony	Year	Category	Nominee / Work	Result	Ref.
SBS Drama Awards	2023	Top Excellence Award, Actor in a Miniseries Genre/Action Drama	Park Sung-woong	Won	
SBS Drama Awards	2023	Best Young Actor	Choi Hyun-jin	Won	
SBS Drama Awards	2023	Best New Actress	Kwon Ah-reum	Won	
SBS Drama Awards	2023	Top Excellence Award, Actor in a Miniseries Genre/Action Drama	Park Hae-jin	Nominated	
SBS Drama Awards	2023	Top Excellence Award, Actress in a Miniseries Genre/Action Drama	Lim Ji-yeon	Nominated	
SBS Drama Awards	2023	Best Supporting Performance in a Miniseries Genre/Action Drama	Shin Jung-geun	Nominated	
SBS Drama Awards	2023	Excellence Award, Actor in a Miniseries Genre/Action Drama	Kim Kwon	Nominated	
SBS Drama Awards	2023	Excellence Award, Actress in a Miniseries Genre/Action Drama	Kim Yoo-mi	Nominated	
