= Midsummer's Equation =

- Poster
- Directed by: Hiroshi Nishitani
- Screenplay by: Yasushi Fukuda
- Based on: Detective Galileo by Keigo Higashino
- Produced by: Tadashi Makino; Yoshihiro Suzuki; Megumi Osawa; Shinya Furugori; Naoto Inaba
- Starring: Masaharu Fukuyama; Yuriko Yoshitaka; Kazuki Kitamura
- Cinematography: Katsumi Yanagishima
- Edited by: Masaaki Yamamoto
- Music by: Masaharu Fukuyama
- Distributed by: Toho (Japan); Panasia Films (Hong Kong)
- Release date: June 29, 2013 (Japan)
- Running time: 129 minutes
- Country: Japan
- Language: Japanese
- Box office: ¥3.31 billion (Japan); US$701,465 (Hong Kong)

Midsummer's Equation (Japanese: 真夏の方程式, Hepburn: Manatsu no Hōteishiki) is a 2013 Japanese police procedural film directed by Hiroshi Nishitani.

== Cast ==
- Masaharu Fukuyama as Manabu Yukawa
- Yuriko Yoshitaka as Misa Kishitani
- Kazuki Kitamura
- Anne Watanabe
- Gin Maeda
- Jun Fubuki

== Reception ==
The film grossed ¥3.31 billion (US$33.92 million) in Japan in 2013, becoming the year's 8th highest-grossing film in Japan, and the highest-grossing live-action Japanese film of the year in the country. Two days after opening in Hong Kong, it had earned HK$1.48 million (US$192,000), and it went on to gross US$701,465 in Hong Kong.

== See also ==
- Galileo (TV series)
