= Lessons for a Perfect Detective Story =

- Meitantei no Okite
- Genre: Comedy; Mystery
- Starring: Shota Matsuda; Yūichi Kimura; Yuu Kashii; Chisun; Jingi Irie
- Country of origin: Japan
- Original language: Japanese
- No. of seasons: 1
- No. of episodes: 10

Original release
- Network: TV Asahi
- Release: 17 April – 19 June 2009

Lessons for a Perfect Detective Story (名探偵の掟, Meitantei no Okite) is a Japanese television drama series that aired on TV Asahi from 17 April 2009 to 19 June 2009. It is based on a book by Keigo Higashino.

== Cast ==
- Shota Matsuda
- Yūichi Kimura
- Yuu Kashii
- Chisun
- Jingi Irie
- Ryosuke Miura
- Ryoko Kobayashi
