= Countdown (2011 film) =

- Theatrical release poster
- Hangul: 카운트다운
- RR: Kaunteudaun
- MR: K'aunt'ŭdaun
- Directed by: Huh Jong-ho
- Written by: Huh Jong-ho
- Produced by: Oh Jung-wan; Jo Kwang-hee
- Starring: Jung Jae-young; Jeon Do-yeon
- Cinematography: Kim Tae-kyung
- Music by: Dalpalan
- Distributed by: Sidus FNH
- Release dates: September 13, 2011 (TIFF); September 29, 2011 (South Korea)
- Running time: 119 minutes
- Country: South Korea
- Language: Korean
- Budget: $6 million
- Box office: $3.2 million

Countdown (Korean: 카운트다운) is a 2011 South Korean crime film that takes the audience on an entertaining journey through the underbelly of South Korea. Starring Jung Jae-young and Jeon Do-yeon, this debut feature by Huh Jong-ho premiered at the 2011 Toronto International Film Festival.

== Plot ==
Tae Gun-ho (Jung Jae-young) is the best debt collection agent in his firm, admired by his colleagues and dreaded by those he visits. He's known for gathering his debts by any means necessary and keeps a cattle prod handy while on the job. Following a series of unexpected fainting spells, Tae is told by a doctor that he has liver cancer, and would need a transplant to have any chance of surviving beyond three months. So, Tae Gun-ho puts his professional skills to work, setting out to collect a different sort of debt by tracking down the recipients of organs donated by his late son. First among his sources for a liver is Cha Ha-yeon (Jeon Do-yeon), a beguiling fraudster with a long list of enemies.

Locating Cha turns out to be easy, since she's about to be released from prison. The deal she proposes, however, which includes getting even with the sleazy crime boss who set her up, jeopardizes Tae's future. He struggles desperately to keep Cha, and her liver, safe until the transplant — meanwhile Cha has other plans.

== Cast ==
- Jung Jae-young as Tae Gun-ho
- Jeon Do-yeon as Cha Ha-yeon
- Lee Geung-young as Jo Myung-suk
- Oh Man-seok as Swy
- Jung Man-sik as department head Han
- Min as Jang Hyeon-ji
- Kwon Hyuk-joon as Yoo-min
- Kim Dong-wook as Nalpari ("gnat")
- Kim Jong-goo as Director Yang
- Kim Kwang-kyu as Detective Park
- Oh Kwang-rok as Dr. Song
- Bae Sung-woo as Dr. Ahn
- Choi Jong-ryul as Gun-ho's father
- Park Hye-jin as Gun-ho's mother
- Bae Yoon-beom as team leader Hong
- Noh Hyun-jung as CEO of CMC
- Kim Min-jae as Dong office clerk
- Jung Hye-sun as granny money lender (cameo)
- Song Hye-kyo as pretty girl (cameo)
