= Hiroshi Kume =

Japanese journalist and author (1944–2026)

- 久米 宏
- Born: 14 July 1944; Urawa, Saitama, Japan
- Died: 1 January 2026 (aged 81)
- Education: Waseda University
- Occupations: TV and radio presenter; anchor; author; journalist
- Years active: 1967–2026
- Agent: Office Two-One
- Notable credit: Kume Hiroshi Radio Nandesukedo host (2006–2026)
- Television: News Station anchor (1985–1999, 2000–2004); The Best Ten host (1978–1985)
- Spouse: Reiko Kume (m. 1969)
- Website: http://kumehiroshi.net

Hiroshi Kume (久米 宏, Kume Hiroshi; 14 July 1944 – 1 January 2026) was a Japanese television and radio presenter, journalist, author, and goodwill ambassador for Germany. He was the host of the TBS radio talk show Kume Hiroshi Radio Nandesukedo.

From 1978 to 1985, he served as host of pop music show The Best Ten. From October 1985 to March 2004, he was the anchor for TV Asahi's news program News Station.

== Biography ==
Kume was born on 14 July 1944, in Urawa, Saitama, which is now part of the city of Saitama. He had three sisters, and he was the youngest child of an engineer working for Japanese National Railways and Toshiba Corporation. After World War II ended, he was moved to Shinagawa, Tokyo, where he was raised.

He loved watching radio and television programs in his early years. Kokontei Shinshō, a prominent rakugo storyteller, was one of the personalities he admired.

== Education ==
Kume studied politics and economics at Waseda University from 1963, graduating in 1967.

== Career ==
=== TBS ===
After Kume graduated from Waseda University in 1967, he started his broadcasting career at TBS as an announcer at age 22. His hard work at that time led him to suffer from tuberculosis.

In April 1970, he became Friday's personality for Back In Music, but five weeks later he retired from it because of illness.

From May 1970, he was a correspondent for the radio program Rokusuke Ei Presents Saturday Wide Radio Tokyo.

In 1975, Kinichi Hagimoto, one of Japan's most notable TV personalities, recommended Kume as the host of the quiz show Pittashi Kan Kan and he also starred. This program was broadcast nationwide, and it helped him to be one of Japan's famous TV personalities.

=== The Best Ten ===
In 1978, Kume became the first host of the pop music show The Best Ten with Tetsuko Kuroyanagi. It was a weekly live music program where top ten artists chosen by viewers' polls appeared and sang on stage, with 41.9% of highest viewership rate. Because this program became very popular, he was confident to be a freelance announcer. In June 1979, he left TBS at age 34. As a freelance announcer, he still was a host of this program until it ended in April 1985.

=== Career as a freelance announcer ===
In April 1980, he was the host for Nippon Television's talk show Oshare until March 1987. In 1982, Kume became the host for infotainment variety program Hiroshi Kume presents TV Scramble with the comedian Yasushi Yokoyama.

=== News Station ===
Kume was the news anchor on TV Asahi's national evening news program News Station from its start on 7 October 1985 until it ended on 26 March 2004 and was replaced by Hōdō Station. The show revolutionized news reporting in Japan and achieved an average of 20 million viewers each night. One correspondent for The Straits Times in 1990 mentioned that for him to explain a news story, he would trot out "three-dimensional models" to make a bigger impact on the audience. His comments on News Station were tongue-in-cheek because he was able to articulate sentiments well. Kume left the audience with one last message as the show finally came to an end after 18 years on the air.

"Commercial broadcasting is a vulnerable and fragile entity, often fraught with risk. Nevertheless, I hold a deep affection for it—one might even call it a devotion. The reason is simple: as a rule, all commercial broadcasting in Japan emerged in the post-war era. It has no firsthand knowledge of war. It does not carry the historical burden of having misled the people toward the path of war. I pray that this remains true for all time."

=== Later career ===
In September 2006, Kume returned to his roots in radio to host a two-hour Saturday show Kume Hiroshi Radio Nandesukedo on TBS Radio. The show ended in 2020.

Kume also presented the weekly TV show Hiroshi Kume's Terebitte Yatsu wa? alongside Akiko Yagi, broadcast on the Mainichi Broadcasting System (MBS) network.

== Political stance ==
Kume said that he was against any ruling party, with his belief that the mass media should keep a distance from the ruling party.

He had been critical of Japan's public broadcaster NHK, and he rarely appeared on NHK's programs, with a few exceptions that he starred in NHK's variety and talk shows by request of Kinichi Hagimoto and Yasushi Akimoto.

When Kume appeared on NHK's live infotainment program Asaichi hosted by Yurie Omi on 19 July 2019, he launched a blistering verbal attack on NHK, saying, "I think NHK should turn into a private broadcasting company. It should be an independent broadcasting organization. There shouldn't be such a broadcasting station got by the balls by the state with its power on personnel affairs and budget. Such a thing should never happen in a developed country." Omi talked back to him on behalf of NHK, saying, "You're saying NHK is got by the balls by the state, but it's an independent public broadcasting station, not state-run broadcasting. As a worker for NHK, I'll do my best for not playing up to anybody." The next day when Kume was talking on Kume Hiroshi Radio Nandesukedo about the progress of Asaichi on the day before, Omi sent an email to the radio station incognito, saying that she was ashamed to be aggressive to him, just like a chihuahua barking at a bigger Doberman.

== Personal life and death ==
In 2011, it was reported that Kume had donated 200 million yen to an earthquake relief fund following the March 2011 Great Eastern Japan Earthquake Disaster.

Kume died from lung cancer on 1 January 2026, at the age of 81.

== Awards ==
- 1983 – Golden Microphone Award from TBS Radio for his contribution to Saturday Wide Radio Tokyo
- 1990 – Galaxy Award from the Japan Council for Better Radio and Television for his contribution to News Station

== Works ==
=== Books ===
- Oshare Kaiwa Nyūmon (おしゃれ会話入門), Seishun, 1978
- Sizuru ha Ikaga (シズルはいかが), Keibunsha, January 1984, ISBN 978-4-7669-0137-5
- Mō Ichido Yomu "Oshare Kaiwa Nyūmon" (もう一度読む「おしゃれ会話入門」), Seishun Super Books, September 1997, ISBN 978-4-413-06272-5
- Saigo no Bansan (最後の晩餐; "The Last Supper"), Shueisha, April 1999, ISBN 978-4-08-774386-9
- Misuteriasu Kekkon (ミステリアスな結婚; "Mysterious Marriage"), Sekaibunka, March 2001, ISBN 978-4-418-01204-6
