= Himitsu (film) =

- Theatrical release poster
- Directed by: Yōjirō Takita
- Written by: Hiroshi Saitō
- Based on: Naoko by Keigo Higashino
- Produced by: Yasuhiro Mase; Junichi Sindo; Setsuro Tagami
- Starring: Ryōko Hirosue; Kaoru Kobayashi; Kayoko Kishimoto; Ken Kaneko; Yuriko Ishida; Hideaki Itō
- Cinematography: Naoki Kayano
- Edited by: Isao Tomita
- Music by: Mariya Takeuchi; Ryudo Uzaki
- Distributed by: TBS
- Release date: 25 September 1999 (Japan)
- Running time: 119 minutes
- Country: Japan
- Language: Japanese

Himitsu (Japanese: 秘密), also known as Secret, is a 1999 Japanese fantasy romance film directed by Yōjirō Takita, starring Ryōko Hirosue, Kaoru Kobayashi and Kayoko Kishimoto and based on the novel Naoko by Keigo Higashino. It was released on 25 September 1999. An English-language French remake, The Secret, was released in 2007.

== Cast ==
- Ryōko Hirosue
- Kaoru Kobayashi
- Kayoko Kishimoto
- Ken Kaneko
- Yuriko Ishida
- Hideaki Itō

== Reception ==
It was chosen as the runner-up in the Best 10 films at the 21st Yokohama Film Festival.

Award	Date	Category	Recipients and nominees	Result
Sitges Film Festival	October 2000	Best Actress	Ryōko Hirosue	Won
Sitges Film Festival	October 2000	Best Screenplay	Hiroshi Saitō	Won
Sitges Film Festival	October 2000	Best Film	Himitsu	Nominated
