= White Night (2009 film) =

- Theatrical poster
- Hangul: 백야행: 하얀 어둠 속을 걷다
- Hanja: 白夜行: 하얀 어둠 속을 걷다
- RR: Baegyahaeng: hayan eodum sogeul geotda
- MR: Paegyahaeng: hayan ŏdum sogŭl kŏtta
- Directed by: Park Shin-woo
- Screenplay by: Park Shin-woo; Park Yeon-seon
- Based on: Journey Under the Midnight Sun by Keigo Higashino
- Produced by: Kang Woo-suk
- Starring: Han Suk-kyu; Son Ye-jin; Go Soo
- Cinematography: Lee Chang-jae
- Edited by: Lee Sang-min
- Music by: Jo Yeong-wook; Shiro Sagisu
- Production companies: Cinema Service; Pollux Pictures
- Distributed by: CJ Entertainment
- Release date: November 19, 2009
- Running time: 135 minutes
- Country: South Korea
- Language: Korean
- Box office: US$6.27 million

White Night (Korean: 백야행: 하얀 어둠 속을 걷다; lit. 'White Night: Walking Through White Darkness') is a 2009 South Korean mystery thriller starring Han Suk-kyu, Son Ye-jin and Go Soo. It was based on the Japanese novel Journey Under the Midnight Sun by Keigo Higashino.

== Plot ==
The film starts when Kim Si-hoo, a pawnbroker, is found dead in a remote town in a derelict building, the police are divided whether it was a murder or a suicide.

Fourteen years previous to that a man's body is found on an abandoned ship. The prime suspect, a woman suspected of being his lover, is also found dead soon afterwards. The woman's daughter Lee Ji-ah later changes her name to Yoo Mi-ho when she moves in with her aunt, where she grows a flower garden.

Fourteen years later, detective Jo Min-woo accidentally discovers the link between the two cases. Talking to the pawnbroker's widow and her son, Kim Yo-han, gives no clue. Then Jo Min-woo requests assistance from Han Dong-soo, who was investigating this case fourteen years ago. Han Dong-soo remembers every fact as this unsolved case ruined his career and killed his son. Dong-soo decides to re-investigate along with Min-woo and Lee Si-yeong, an employee of Mi-ho's rich fiance.

Yo-han has matured into a murderer and eliminates those who get in Mi-ho's way. He is a bad guy. He exists as Mi-ho's shadow, requiring nothing in return. Secretly they are still as close as ever while they are living out separate lives. Mi-ho knows of Yo-han's crimes but looks away from them and encourages them. It is later revealed that Yo-han killed his father after he found him molesting Ji-ah, and Ji-ah killed her mother who was pimping her out to throw suspicion off Yo-han. In the end, Yo-han kills himself to protect Ji-ah.

== Cast ==
- Han Suk-kyu as Han Dong-soo
- Son Ye-jin as Yoo Mi-ho / Lee Ji-ah
- Go Soo as Kim Yo-han
- Lee Min-jung as Lee Si-yeong
- Park Sung-woong as Cha Seung-jo
- Cha Hwa-yeon as Seo Hae-yeong (Yo-han's mother)
- Jeong Jin as Park Tae-ho
- Im Ji-kyu as Yak-tong
- Bang Joong-hyeon as Detective Jo Min-woo
- Yoon Da-gyeong as Park Mi-yeon
- Jung In-gi as Kang Jae-doo
- Hong Ji-hee as Cha Yeong-eun
- Joo Da-young as young Lee Ji-ah
- Won Deok-hyeon as young Kim Yo-han
- Ye Soo-jeong as Aunt
- Han Ye-won as Na-hyeon
- Kim Ji-hyeon as Hong Yoon-mi
- Jo Kyeong-sook as Yang Mi-sook
- Choi Jin-ho as Kim Si-hoo
- Han Cheol-woo as Detective Ko
- Seo Dong-soo as Crime lab investigation team leader
- Jo Seok-hyeon as Detective Choi
- Im Se-jin as Detective Moon
- Han Kook-jin as Detective Oh
- Yoon Chan as Min-jae
- Seo Jin-won as Detective Jang
- Lee Jae-goo as Gangnam team leader
- Kim Sung-oh as 40-year-old man

== Production ==
Keigo Higashino's story Journey Under the Midnight Sun was first serialized in Shueisha magazine from 1997 to 1999, then compiled into a novel. It has been adapted several times, among them the Japanese drama Byakuyakō which aired on TBS in 2006, and the 2011 Japanese film Into the White Night.

Director Park Shin-woo was inspired to write the script after being impressed with the novel Journey Under the Midnight Sun. He sent the screenplay to author Keigo Higashino, who said it was "superb," and allowed it to be adapted into a film.

White Night is Park's feature directorial debut. He first drew attention after his short film About a Bad Boy won the jury award at the Mise-en-scène Short Film Festival.

Actress Son Ye-jin was Park's first and only choice for the role of Yoo Mi-ho after having attended high school with her in Daegu. He said, "She was very quiet back then. I've seen her onscreen and thought she was very talented because she pulled off characters that were so different from how she was like in real life." Though Son was extremely flattered and called the project "her destiny," she didn't find the role easy because she was unaccustomed to playing a character so dark and sinister, and "wanted to make her look like someone deserving sympathy." For Son, the most difficult scene to film was the one in which her character appears nude and comforts her fiance's daughter after she is sexually assaulted by Yo-han. Son expressed her concern that the scene might be misinterpreted by audiences as vulgar or gratuitous, stressing that the scene is painful and a glimpse into Mi-ho's state of mind.

The director then cast Han Suk-kyu as Han Dong-soo. The actor, then-44 years old, had initially turned down the role because he felt he was too young to play the 50-year-old detective. Han said, "I wished I would have been 10 years older, so I refused the part. But the director wrote me a handwritten letter explaining why he had to use me for the part... When I met him I was convinced by his sincerity, and I thought perhaps I wasn't challenging myself enough as an actor."

This was actor Go Soo's first onscreen role after his two-year mandatory military service. Go said he decided to play Kim Yo-han because he was "completely absorbed by the intriguing storyline."

The film was produced by Kang Woo-suk, who has directed several Korean blockbusters, including the Public Enemy series (Public Enemy, Another Public Enemy, and Public Enemy Returns) and Silmido. Kang said, "Frankly I'm not a big fan of works based on Japanese comic books or novels. But I read this story and thought the cultural values and sentiments were very relatable." Kang, who rarely attends promotional press events for his films but attended the press conference for White Night, said he did it because he "really believed in the project and our young director who helmed it."

== Reception ==
=== Box office ===
White Night opened second at the South Korean box office, selling 292,504 tickets and grossing US$1,945,227 on 480 screens and accounting for 17.2% of all tickets sold during its opening November 20 to 22 weekend. The film received a total of 945,938 admissions nationwide and a gross of US$6,095,018 at the end of its theater run.

=== Critical response ===
Paul Quinn of Hangul Celluloid gave the film a generally positive review, finding it "difficult to believe that this is Park Shin-woo's first directorial full-length feature." He described the imagery as "sumptuously beautiful (even when horrific scenes are being played onscreen) with near-perfect pacing throughout and, though White Night is a long film (135 minutes in duration), at no point does the story either drag or rush in any respect."

James Mudge of Beyond Hollywood also praised the film, "not only as a highly intelligent detective thriller, but also as an involving and moving character drama," "morally challenging and heart rending," with "intriguing, ambiguous" lead characters. He called Park's direction "elegant and impressively stylish in the modern noir manner," and singled out Son's "brave, multi-layered performance that effectively provides the film with its touching, yet twisted emotional core." He concluded his review by declaring White Night "one of the best Korean films of 2009, and certainly one of the few mystery thrillers not to patronize its audience with easy answers or comfortable resolutions."

== Awards and nominations ==
| Year | Award | Category | Recipient | Result |
|---|---|---|---|---|
| 2010 | 30th Korean Association of Film Critics Awards | Best New Actress | Lee Min-jung | Won |
| 2010 | 31st Blue Dragon Film Awards | Best New Actor | Go Soo | Nominated |
| 2010 | 31st Blue Dragon Film Awards | Popularity Award | Son Ye-jin | Won |
| 2010 | 1st Seoul Arts & Culture Awards | Best Film Actor | Son Ye-jin | Won |
| 2010 | 14th Puchon International Fantastic Film Festival | Fantasia Award | Go Soo | Won |

== See also ==
- Journey Under the Midnight Sun
- Into the White Night (Japanese film, 2011)
