= Perfect Number (film) =

- Film poster
- Hangul: 용의자X
- Hanja: 容疑者X
- RR: Yonguija X
- MR: Yongŭija X
- Directed by: Bang Eun-jin
- Written by: Lee Gong-joo; Lee Jung-hwa; Kim Tae-yoon
- Based on: The Devotion of Suspect X by Keigo Higashino
- Produced by: Jung Tae-sung; Shin Yang-jung; Im Sang-jin
- Starring: Ryoo Seung-bum; Lee Yo-won; Cho Jin-woong
- Cinematography: Choi Chan-min
- Edited by: Yoo Sung-yup; Baek Eun-ja
- Music by: Shin Yi-kyung
- Production companies: K&Entertainment
- Distributed by: CJ Entertainment
- Release dates: October 7, 2012 (Busan International Film Festival); October 18, 2012 (South Korea)
- Running time: 107 minutes
- Country: South Korea
- Language: Korean
- Box office: US$10,187,540

Perfect Number (Korean: 용의자X; lit. 'Suspect X') is a 2012 South Korean mystery thriller film directed by Bang Eun-jin. Adapted from Keigo Higashino's novel The Devotion of Suspect X, it centers around a mild-mannered mathematics teacher (Ryoo Seung-bum) who plans the perfect alibi for the woman he secretly loves (Lee Yo-won) when she unexpectedly murders her abusive ex-husband. Cho Jin-woong received a Best Supporting Actor nomination at the 49th Baeksang Arts Awards in 2013. It was remade into the 2023 Indian film Jaane Jaan by Kross Pictures. Kolaigaran, another Indian film, was an unofficial remake of the film released in 2019.

== Plot ==
Kim Seok-go showed promise as a mathematician when he was in school, resolutely focused on his studies rather than on friends throughout his childhood. Now in his 30s, he's an ordinary high school math teacher, a far cry from the promising future of his youth. Seok-go is solemn and introverted, and his morning exchanges with Baek Hwa-sun, the cafe employee he buys lunch from, are the brightest part of his day. When Hwa-sun's ex-husband mercilessly beats Hwa-sun and her niece, Hwa-sun kills him. Seok-go overhears the fight from his house next door and decides to cover up the killing and protect her from the police. He uses his genius to meticulously plan the perfect alibi for her, and thanks to his efforts, Hwa-sun is cleared in the case. However, the detective in charge, Jo Min-beom, believes that Hwa-sun is guilty and follows his intuition despite the lack of evidence. Min-beom also happens to have gone to the same high school as Seok-go, and when he finds out that his old school friend lives next door to the prime suspect, he starts digging deeper into Seok-go's life.

== Cast ==
- Ryoo Seung-bum as Kim Seok-go
- Lee Yo-won as Baek Hwa-sun
- Cho Jin-woong as Detective Jo Min-beom
- Kim Yoon-sung as Sang-joon, Min-beom's colleague
- Kim Bo-ra as Yoon-ah, Hwa-sun's niece
- Lee Seok-joon as Nam Tae-woo
- Im Sung-min as Jung-sook
- Kwak Min-ho as Kim Cheol-min
- Kwon Hae-hyo as police team leader
- Nam Moon-cheol as police section chief
- Park Hyung-soo as investigation team member 1
- Nam Yeon-woo as investigation team member 2
- Lee Hwang-eui as homeless man 1
- Lee Soo-hyung as homeless man 2
- Kim Joo-ryung as Madam Jung
- Han Do-hyun as Seok-go in high school
- Kim Ah-ron as girl
- Baek Seung-do as Seok-go's student
- Park Jung-pyo as emergency room doctor
- Myung Gye-nam as Jinsung Inn proprietor
- Song Young-chang as polygraph examiner
- Chae Young-in as diving master
