= Salvation of a Saint =

2008 novel by Keigo Higashino

- First edition (Japanese)
- Author: Keigo Higashino
- Original title: Seijo no Kyūsai 聖女の救済
- Translator: Alexander O. Smith
- Language: Japanese
- Series: Detective Galileo
- Genre: Crime / mystery novel
- Publisher: Bungeishunjū (Japanese); Minotaur Books (English)
- Publication date: 2008
- Publication place: Japan
- English publication date: 2012
- Media type: Print (hardback & paperback)
- Pages: 378 (Japanese); 336 (English)
- ISBN: 978-4-163-27610-6 (Japanese); ISBN 978-0-312-60068-6 (English)
- Preceded by: The Devotion of Suspect X
- Followed by: Galileo no Kunō ガリレオの苦悩

Salvation of a Saint (聖女の救済, Seijo no Kyūsai) is a 2008 novel by Keigo Higashino, the second in his Detective Galileo series. The English translation was published in 2012.

An Indian film adaptation of the novel is currently in production by Kross Pictures.

== Plot summary ==
The husband of famous patchwork quilter Ayane Mita is found dead while she is away on a trip to visit her parents at Sapporo. Traces of arsenic poison have been found in his coffee mug. Detective Kusanagi, along with junior detectives Kaoru Utsumi and Kishitani are assigned to the case. Upon initial investigation, Yoshitaka's (Ayane's husband) affair with Ayane's apprentice, Hiromi Wakayama comes to light. All suspicion falls on Hiromi as she was the last person to see Yoshitaka alive and has no alibi to suggest otherwise. Later, it is revealed that Ayane was aware of the affair, providing a potential motive. However, the question still remained: how would she succeed in poisoning her husband's coffee while she was physically so far away from him, at Sapporo?

The plot widens as Utsumi consults Kusanagi's old friend, Manabu Yukawa (also known as Detective Galileo), a physics professor with a keen eye for detail.
