= Journey Under the Midnight Sun =

Book by Keigo Higashino

- Author: Keigo Higashino
- Original title: Byakuyakō 白夜行
- Translator: Alexander O. Smith
- Language: Japanese
- Genre: Social mystery, Thriller
- Publisher: Shueisha (Japanese); Little, Brown (English)
- Publication date: 1999
- Publication place: Japan
- English publication date: 2015
- Media type: Print, e-book
- ISBN: 978-4087744002

Journey Under the Midnight Sun (白夜行, Byakuyakō) (also published in English as Under the Midnight Sun) is a mystery novel written by Keigo Higashino, first serialized in the monthly novel magazine Subaru from Shueisha from January 1997 to January 1999. The entire volume was published in August 1999 and became a bestseller.

During the serialization, the novel was at first written as a series of short stories representing chronological snapshots of the overall plot line. Higashino modified its structure to make it a single coherent story before publishing it as a single volume. As of November 2005 the book had sold 550,000 copies. However, its sales quickly picked up after the first episode of the adapted TV series was aired. By January 2006 its sales had broken a million. Its sales exceeded 2 million in December 2010.

The novel attracted adaptations, including a stage drama in 2005, a Japanese TV series in 2006, a Korean motion picture in 2009, and a Japanese motion picture in 2010.

== Novel summary ==
The story begins in 1973, with the death of an Osakan pawnbroker, Yosuke Kirihara, under strange circumstances. The investigation, headed by officer Junzo Sasagaki, gradually uncovers Fumiyo Nishimoto, a mother struggling to make ends meet and one of his customers, and her boyfriend Tadao Terasaki, as prime suspects. However, the Osakan police are unable to definitely prove their involvement, and both are eventually found dead; Fumiyo dies in an accidental gas leak in her house, and Terasaki dies in a traffic accident. The story primarily concerns itself with the effects of this incident on two people: Ryoji Kirihara, the pawnbroker's son, and Yukiho Nishimoto, Fumiyo's daughter. The novel avoids directly revealing the two's thoughts to the reader, instead preferring to reveal information second-hand through the viewpoints of multiple other supporting characters whose lives intersect to form a complete picture of the story's events.

Ryoji ends up growing into a moody, sullen and cynical youth who gets involved in a number of shady dealings, such as housewife prostitution rings, computer game bootlegging, hacking corporate programs, and wiretapping. He is shown to be resourceful and intelligent, easily manipulating people into doing what he wants. The novel strongly suggests that he commits multiple murders, including Isamu Matsuura, a former employee of his father's shop who he assists in a videogame bootlegging scheme. These murders force him to assume fake names and run from the police.

Yukiho is adopted by a relative of her father's (changing her last name from Nishimoto to Karasawa) and matures into a beautiful upper-class woman, attracting the attention of multiple men and achieving success in different fields, such as stock trading and opening up a successful clothing store chain. However, many people connected to her suffer from incredible misfortunes, and several characters in the narrative note that there is a hidden dark side to Yukiho hidden beneath the surface.

Throughout the story, Sasagaki shows up multiple times, unable to let go of the unresolved murder and determined to find the truth, even after the case passes the statute of limitations. Twenty years after the incident in 1992, he is finally able to piece together the truth: Fumiyo Nishimoto was prostituting her daughter to Yosuke Kirihara in order to pay the bills, explaining the interest displayed by Yosuke towards the family in the beginning of the story. Ryoji, who was Yukiho's friend, became suspicious after seeing her with his father and followed them to an abandoned building, where he witnessed Yosuke molesting her. In his grief, he killed his father with a pair of scissors. In turn, Yukiho killed her mother by drugging her with sleeping pills and causing a gas leak in her house. Ryoji and Yukiho then developed a close relationship of some sort in order to cope with their grief, using their talents to achieve success and ruthlessly disposing of anyone who got in their way.

Towards the novel's end, Sasagaki is able to obtain evidence linking Ryoji to Matsuura's death. The police wait for him to appear at the opening of Yukiho's second shop on Christmas Day, and discover he is one of the employees dressing up as Santa Claus. Cornered, Ryoji runs to the top of the building and jumps to his death. When asked, Yukiho denies knowing him.

== Characters ==
Ryoji Kirihara (桐原亮司, Kirihara Ryōji)

The son of the victim killed 19 years ago, Ryoji's eyes have been dark and emotionless since the childhood incidence. He loathes getting close with other people. He started to get involved in shady businesses like housewife prostitution rings and game bootlegging when he was a student. He is a very astute man who possesses professional software skills. He loves to use vintage scissors of his since childhood and is very good at paper cutting. (The English translation by Alexander Smith renamed him Ryo Kirihara for reasons unknown.)

Yukiho Karasawa (Nishimoto) (唐沢(西本)雪穂, Karasawa (Nishimoto) Yukiho)

A stunning beauty, Yukiho is the daughter of one of the suspects of the pawnshop homicide 19 years ago. A primary school student then, she lived a poor life with her mother. Her mother died in an accident shortly after the murder. Afterward Yukiho was adopted by Karasawa, received a good education, and turned into an upper-class lady with manners and elegance. Her academic grades were excellent, causing a lot of envy. People close to her often fall prey to misfortunes.

Junzo Sasagaki (笹垣潤三, Sasagaki Junzō)

An officer in the Crime Investigation Unit of the Osaka Prefectural Police, Junzo was in charge of the investigation of the pawnshop incidence. Over the years of investigation, he grew suspicious of the mysterious events befallen on people close to Yukiho and Ryoji; he has been investigating them since. He likes Seven Stars cigarettes very much.

Hisashi Koga (古賀久志, Koga Hisashi)

An officer in the Crime Investigation Unit of the Osaka Prefectural Police, Hisashi was also investigating the pawnshop incidence. He rose through the ranks of the police force in the following 19 years. He is Junzo's coworker as well as his relative.

Yosuke Kirihara (桐原洋介, Kirihara Yōsuke)

The owner of the "Kirihara" pawnshop and Ryoji's father, Yosuke was killed 19 years ago. He cared about his son very much.

Yaeko Kirihara (桐原弥生子, Kirihara Yaeko)

Mother of Ryoji, Yaeko became the owner of the pawnshop after her husband died. After the pawnshop was closed due to mismanagement, she opened a small cafeteria. Yaeko knows she is not a responsible mother to Ryoji.

Isamu Matsuura (松浦勇, Matsuura Isamu)

The store manager of the "Kirihara" pawnshop, Isamu knows a lot of secrets about the Kirihara family. He later approaches Ryoji as a broker of unauthorized game software.

Fumiyo Nishimoto (西本文代, Nishimoto Fumiyo)

Mother of Yukiho, Fumiyo was seen by the police as a suspect in the pawnshop incidence. Soon after the murder, she died from a gas leakage at home. The truth, however, is much darker...

Reiko Karasawa (唐沢礼子, Karasawa Reiko)

Yukiho's distant relative, Reiko adopted Yukiho after her mother died. She is very strict in teaching Yukiho to behave like a lady.

Yuichi Akiyoshi (秋吉雄一, Akiyoshi Yūichi)

Ryoji's secondary schoolmate, Yuichi was secretly photographing Yukiho.

Fumihiko Kikuchi (菊池文彦, Kikuchi Fumihiko)

Ryoji's secondary schoolmate, Fumihiko had photos about a secret of Ryoji's mother Yaeko. He was later set up and became the suspect of another crime.

Eriko Kawashima (川島江利子, Kawashima Eriko)

Yukiho's university schoolmate, Eriko had a short romantic relationship with Shinozuka Kazunari started by his proposing. She was kidnapped mysteriously later and separated with him. She respected and depended on Yukiho a lot during university days but later became distant. Years later she got married with an ordinary worker. She holds a complex and doubtful attitude toward Yukiho.

== TV series ==
=== Cast ===
- Takayuki Yamada as Ryoji Kirihara (桐原亮司, Kirihara Ryōji)
  - Yuki Izumisawa as childhood Ryoji
- Ayase Haruka as Yukiho Karasawa (唐沢雪穂, Karasawa Yukiho)
  - Mayuko Fukuda as Yukiho Nishimoto (西本雪穂, Nishimoto Yukiho), (childhood Yukiho before adoption)
- Tetsuya Takeda as Junzo Sasagaki (笹垣潤三, Sasagaki Junzō)
- Atsuro Watabe as Isamu Matsuura (松浦勇, Matsuura Isamu)
- Takashi Kashiwabara as Kazunari Shinozuka (篠塚一成, Shinozuka Kazunari)
- Mitsuru Hirata as Yosuke Kirihara (桐原洋介, Kirihara Yōsuke)
- Yumi Asō as Yaeko Kirihara (桐原弥生子, Kirihara Yaeko)
- Kotaro Tanaka as Hisashi Koga (古賀久志, Koga Hisashi)
- Keisuke Koide as Tomohiko Sonomura (園村友彦, Sonomura Tomohiko)
- Kei Tanaka as Michihiro Kikuchi (菊池道広, Kikuchi Michihiro)
- Hiroyuki Onoue as Yuichi Akiyoshi (秋吉雄一, Akiyoshi Yūichi)
- Kaoru Yachigusa as Reiko Karasawa (唐沢礼子, Karasawa Reiko)
- Kaoru Okunuki as Namie Nishiguchi (西口奈美江, Nishiguchi Namie)
- Chihiro Otsuka as Eriko Kawashima (川島江利子, Kawashima Eriko)
- Momoko Kurasawa as Miyako Fujimura (藤村都子, Fujimura Miyako)
- Seina Kasugai as Ryoko Kotake (小竹亮子, Kotake Ryōko)
- Shun Shioya as Makoto Takamiya (高宮誠, Takamiya Makoto)
- Hitomi Satō as Chizuru Misawa (三沢千都留, Misawa Chizuru)
- Michiko Kawai as Fumiyo Nishimoto (西本文代, Nishimoto Fumiyo)
- Kimiko Yo as Mafumi Taniguchi (谷口真文, Taniguchi Mafumi)
- Naomi Nishida as Noriko Kurihara (栗原典子, Kurihara Noriko)

== Awards ==
Year	Award	Category	Recipients	Result
2006	48th Television Drama Academy Awards	Best Drama	Byakuyakou	Won
2006	48th Television Drama Academy Awards	Best Actor	Takayuki Yamada	Won
2006	48th Television Drama Academy Awards	Best Supporting Actress	Haruka Ayase	Won
2006	48th Television Drama Academy Awards	Best Supporting Actor	Tetsuya Takeda	Won

== See also ==
- White Night (Korean film, 2009)
- Into the White Night (Japanese film, 2011)
