= The Secret (2007 film) =

- Promotional film poster
- French: Si j'étais toi
- Directed by: Vincent Perez
- Written by: Ann Cherkis
- Produced by: Luc Besson; Virginie Silla
- Starring: David Duchovny; Olivia Thirlby; Lili Taylor
- Cinematography: Paul Sarossy
- Music by: Nathaniel Méchaly
- Production company: EuropaCorp
- Distributed by: EuropaCorp Distribution
- Release date: 10 October 2007
- Country: France
- Language: English
- Box office: $943,117

The Secret (French: Si j'étais toi; lit. 'If I were you') is a 2007 English-language French thriller film directed by Vincent Perez and starring David Duchovny, Olivia Thirlby, and Lili Taylor.

It is a remake of Yōjirō Takita's Himitsu, a 1999 Japanese film produced by Yasuhiro Mase, written by Hiroshi Saitô.

== Plot ==
The beginning of the film reveals the strained relationship between Hannah (Lili Taylor) and her teenaged daughter Samantha (Olivia Thirlby). Hannah has been the primary disciplinarian as opposed to Samantha's permissive father Ben (David Duchovny). During a heated argument in the car with Samantha, Hannah's focus is momentarily diverted from the road, causing a head-on collision with an oncoming truck. Mother and daughter are taken to the hospital's ICU, both of them code, and Hannah dies. Unknown to Ben, Hannah's spirit migrates to Samantha's body, but he eventually believes it when 'Samantha' tells him things that only his wife would know.

Both resolve that Hannah continue to live as Samantha, for if and when she returns. Living in Samantha's body, Hannah endeavors to maintain an emotional relationship with her husband while struggling with the often confusing impulses of a teenager. Ben and Hannah come perilously close to being intimate as man and wife. Hannah begins to learn a lot about the previously unknown (to her) life her daughter was living, which helps her understand how harrowing a teen's life can be. She faces demanding schoolwork that she finds largely unfamiliar; a couple of decades have passed since her own graduation. And she discovers that Samantha's life has been a challenge to meet her parents' expectations for academic excellence and behavior, all while being overwhelmed by adolescent hormones and a confused sense of self. This includes the discovery that Samantha was having sex with multiple partners. Hannah struggles to keep her grip; and Ben's possessiveness toward his wife's soul in his daughter's body threatens to completely overwhelm both of their lives, with nearly disastrous results. Hannah also starts to rediscover her own lost dreams when teachers praise her talent as a photographer.

Hannah's conflict with Ben comes to a head when she escapes through a bedroom window and goes to Samantha's friends, who persuade her to try Ketamine, causing Hannah to hallucinate and see herself dead, as Hannah. When Ben tracks her down and takes her home, Samantha briefly reappears then disappears again, over the traumatic realization that her mother is dead. Ben and Hannah both realize that Samantha is coming back. Hannah makes final preparations for Samantha's return, and makes a video explaining to Samantha what happened. After Samantha returns to her body, she belatedly sees how much she really did love her mother. The final scene shows a radically changed Samantha, who now has adopted her mother's handwriting.

== Cast ==
- David Duchovny as Dr. Ben Marris
- Olivia Thirlby as Samantha Marris
- Lili Taylor as Hannah Marris
- Brendan Sexton III as Ethan

== Release ==
The film was not given a theatrical release in the United States, instead going straight-to-video on August 26, 2008 on DVD and Blu-ray.
