= Elina Arai =

Japanese tarento and reporter

- 新井 恵理那
- Born: 22 December 1989 (age 36); California
- Other names: Arai-chan (新井ちゃん); Elīna (えりーな); Araeli (アラエリ)
- Education: Kokugakuin High School; Aoyama Gakuin University Comprehensive Cultural Policy Studies
- Occupation: Reporter
- Years active: 2009–
- Agent: Cent Force
- Known for: Shin Jōhō 7 days Newscaster; Good! Morning; Sokuhō J-League Goal Highlight; Utae! Doyōbi: Love Hits; Mezamashi TV; Gyokai Top News; Pon!; Oha! 4 News Live; Shu-ichi
- Height: 1.58 m (5 ft 2 in)

Elina Arai (新井 恵理那, Arai Erina; born 22 December 1989, in California) is a Japanese tarento and reporter. She is represented with Cent Force.

== Current appearances ==
=== TV series ===
Year	Title	Network	Notes	Ref.
2013	Sokuhō J-League Goal Highlight	Suka-Chan, BS Sky PerfecTV!	MC	
2014	Shin Jōhō 7 days Newscaster	TBS	Weather caster	
2015	Good! Morning	TV Asahi	"Entame Corner" caster	
2016	Sekai Naze Soko ni? Nihon-jin: Shira Rezaru Haranbanjō-den	TV Tokyo	MC	

=== Radio ===
Year	Title	Network	Notes
2015	Utae! Doyōbi: Love Hits	NHK Radio 1	Disc jockey

== Former appearances ==
=== Television ===
Year	Title	Network	Role	Notes	Ref.
2011	Mezamashi TV		Fuji TV	"Imadoki" reporter	
2012	Pon!		NTV	Mondays, weather caster on Thursdays	
2012	Gyokai Top News		TV Asahi	Saturdays; assistant	
2012	Sports Kyoushitsu		NHK E TV	Assistant	
2013	Shuden Bye Bye	Akemi	TBS	Episode 3	
2013	Oha! 4 News Live		NTV News 24	Entertainment caster	
2014	Shu-ichi		NTV	Part of Shu-ichi Girls	
2015	Nep League		Fuji TV		
2016	Akira Ikegami no News Sōdatta no ka!!		TV Asahi		

== Photobooks ==
Year	Title
2014	Elīna no Tameni

== Other ==
Year	Title
2012	Elina Arai 2013 Calendar
2013	Elina Arai 2014 Calendar
