= Sugisaki =

Sugisaki (written: 杉崎 or 杉咲) is a Japanese surname. Notable people with the surname include:

- Hana Sugisaki (杉咲 花; born 1997), Japanese actress
- Mika Sugisaki (杉崎 美香; born 1978), Japanese announcer, radio personality, entertainer and actress
- Yukiru Sugisaki (杉崎 ゆきる; born 1974), Japanese manga artist

== Fictional characters ==
- Ken Sugisaki (杉崎 鍵), protagonist of the light novel series Seitokai no Ichizon

== See also ==
- Sugisaki Station, a railway station in Hida, Gifu Prefecture, Japan
