= 憲和 =

憲和, meaning 'rule, peace', may refer to:

- Norikazu, a masculine Japanese given name
- Xianhe, a courtesy name of Chinese politician Jian Yong
