= Aiko Kaitou =

- 皆藤 愛子
- Born: January 25, 1984 (age 42); Yotsukaidō, Chiba Prefecture, Japan
- Other name: Ai-chan
- Education: Makuhari Junior and Senior High School; Tamatea High School; Waseda University
- Occupations: Newscaster, tarento
- Years active: 2004–
- Agent: Cent Force
- Known for: Mezamashi TV; Mezamashi Saturday; Kao Essential
- Height: 1.58 m (5 ft 2 in)
- Website: Official profile

Aiko Kaitou (皆藤 愛子, Kaitō Aiko; born January 25, 1984, in Yotsukaidō, Chiba Prefecture, Japan) is a Japanese newscaster and tarento represented by Cent Force. She is nicknamed Ai-chan (愛ちゃん).

== Current appearances ==
Year	Title	Network	Notes
2009	Shūkan Hōdō Biz Street	BS-TBS	
2015	Brain×Foot	TV Tokyo	
2015	NHK Kōkō Kōza	NHK E TV	

== Former appearances ==
=== TV series ===
Kaitou mainly appeared on Fuji Television series.

Regular appearances

Year	Title	Notes
2005	Mezamashi TV	Weather caster, information caster
2009	Honne no Dendō!! Shinsuke ni wa Wakaru Mai	Assistant
2011	Mezamashi Saturday	Main caster
2012	Unbelievable	
2013	Sōhōkō Quiz Tenka Tōitsu	NHK; MC
2013	Shumi Do-raku	NHK E TV

Guest appearances

Year	Title	Notes
2005	Moshimo Tours	
2005	Hey!Say!A Board of Education	
2005	Tonneruzu no Minasan no Okage deshita	
2005	Hey! Spring of Trivia	
2006	All Star Dai shūgō! Ippatsushōbu de Shōkin Get! IraIra Game Land	
2007	Kawazu-kun no Kensaku Seikatsu	
2007	Bakushō Red Carpet	
2007	Lion no Gokigenyō	
2007	Abbare!! Sanma Dai Kyōju	
2007	Matsuken Ima-chan Othello no Go!Go! Sata	
2007	IQ Sapuri	
2007	Haneru no to Bira	
2007	Sanma no Manma	
2007	Nekketsu! Heisei Kyōiku Gakuin	
2007	Zenkoku Issei! Nihonjin Test	
2007	Nep League	
2007	Bakushō Sokkuri mo no Mane Benishiroutagassen Special	
2008	Riyū Aru Tarō	
2008	Matsumoto Hitoshi no Suberanai Hanashi The Golden	
2008	Waratte Iitomo!	
2008	Ikkakusenkin! Nihon rū Rettō	
2008	Chijō Saidai no TV Dōbutsuen	
2008	Echika no TV: Kokoro ni Kiku TV	
2008	Peke×Pon	
2009	Mecha-Mecha Iketeru!	
2009	Owarai Geinin Magic Ōzakettei-sen Special	
2009	Hey! Hey! Hey! Music Champ	
2009	Vs Arashi	
2009	The Red Theater	
2009	Owarai Geinindo Kkiri Ōzakettei-sen Special	
2009	Geinōjin Kodawari-ō Kōza iketaku	
2009	VivaVivaV6	
2009	Sagasou! Nippon Hito no Wasuremono	
2009	FNS Ninki Bangumi Taikō! All-Star Quiz	
2009	Bakushō Dai Nihon Akan Keisatsu	
2010	Oshiete Mr. News Akira Ikegami no Sōnanda Nippon	
2010	Masahiro Nakai no Sekai wa Suge! Koko Made Shirabemashita SP	
2010	Usohonti	
2010	SMAP×SMAP	
2011	Hoko×Tate	
2011	Sanma & Cream no Geinō-kai (hi) Kojin Jōhō Grand Prix	
2011	Mezamashi Doyōbi Mega	
2011	The Manzai	
2012	Sekai Itte Mitara Honto wa Konna Tokodatta!?	
2012	Omoshiro Kotoba Game Omojan	
2012	Geinō-kai Tokugi-ō Kettei-sen Teppen	
2012	Numer0n	
2012	Cha$e	
2012	Suites Kōshien	BS Fuji
2012	Mabatakī	
2013	FNS 27-jikan TV	
2013	20-shūnen Mezamashi TV Yoru no Dai Dōsōkai!	
2014	battle for money Sentō-chū	
2015	MiLLENiUMS	

Non-Fuji Television guest appearances

Year	Title	Network	Notes
2013	Nagoya Woman's Marathon 2013	THK	
2013	GuruGuru Ninety-Nine	NTV	
2013	All-Star Thanksgiving	TBS	
2013	Coming Out Variety!! Himitsu no Kenmin Show	NTV	
2013	100-byō Hakase Academy	TBS	
2014	Shabekuri 007	NTV	
2014	Shimura & Tokoro no Tatakau Oshōgatsu	TV Asahi	
2014	Tsutaete Pikatchi	NHK	
2014	Daikaizō!! Gekiteki Before-After	TV Asahi	
2014	Sokuhō! Ariyoshi no Owarai Daitōryō Senkyo	TV Asahi	
2015	Osamu Hayashi no Imadesho! Kōza	TV Asahi	
2015	Akira Ikegami no News-sōdatta no ka	TV Asahi	
2015	Jobuchūn Ano Shokugyō no Himitsu Butcha Kemasu!	TBS	

=== Dramas ===
Year	Title	Role	Notes
2005	Densha Otoko	Kaoru Hayama	Episodes 4 and 5
2006	Chibi Maruko-chan	Tama-chan (adult)	
2007	Hanayome to Papa	Kimono woman	Episode 10
2008	Isshun no Kaze ni Nare	Weather caster	
2009	Handsome Suit: The TV	Herself	
2009	Full Throttle Girl	Urara Hanamura	
2009	Nagasawa-kun	Himeko Jogasaki	TBS

=== Radio series ===
Year	Title	Network	Notes
2009	Blue Ocean	Tokyo FM	
2010	DHC Count Down Japan	Tokyo FM	
2010	Aiko Kaitou Ai Radi	NBS	
2011	Golden Bomber Sho Kiryuin no All Night Nippon	NBS	
2013	Future College: Radio no Gakkō	FM Osaka	

== Films ==
Year	Title	Role	Notes
2007	Tamagotchi: The Movie	Repotchi (voice)	
2008	Gekijō-ban GeGeGe no Kitarō Nihon Bakuretsu!!	Herself (voice)	
2009	One Piece Film: Strong World	Eva (voice)	
2010	Odorudaisōsasen The Movie 3: Yatsu-ra o Kaihō Seyo	Reporter	

== Advertisements ==
Year	Title	Notes
2008	ANA Kokunaisen Waribiki Unchin "Tabi Wari"	
2008	Lotte Xylitol Gum	
2008	Kao Essential	
2009	Nippon Rent-A-Car	
2009	Asahi Beer Mugi Shibori	
2010	East Nippon Expressway Company	
2010	Yayoi	
2011	House Foods Ukon no Chikara	
2012	E-net	
2014	Yōfuku no Aoyama Anchor Woman	
2014	Asahi Soft Drinks Asahi Oishī Mizu Fujisan	

== Advertising ==
Year	Title	Notes
2007	Kaiteki Tsūkin Suishin Kyōgi-kai "Kaiteki Tsūkin Off Peak Campaign"	
2008	Storia	
2009	The General Insurance Association of Japan "Jidōsha Jibaiseki Hoken Kanyū Sokushin"	
2009	Zennihon Kōtsū Anzen Kyōkai "Aki no Zenkoku Kōtsū Anzen Undō"	
2011	Konica Minolta "Planetarium 'Manten'"	
2015	Ministry of Internal Affairs and Communications "Heisei 28-nen Keizai Census: Katsudō Chōsa"	

== Discography ==
=== CD ===
Year	Title	Notes
2010	Try Little Love: Chigiregumono, Soranoshita	
2010	Mezamashi TV Gakunabi: Ao-ban	
2010	Mezamashi TV Gakunabi: Haru-ban	

=== DVD ===
Year	Title	Notes
2006	Mezamashi Taisō Dai 2	
2006	Mezamashi Taisō Dai 3	
2008	Cent. Force Presents: Seasons Vol.3 - 4	

=== Music videos ===
Year	Title	Notes
2009	Hilcrhyme "Junya to Manami"	
