= Maki Okazoe =

Japanese TV presenter and model

- 岡副 麻希
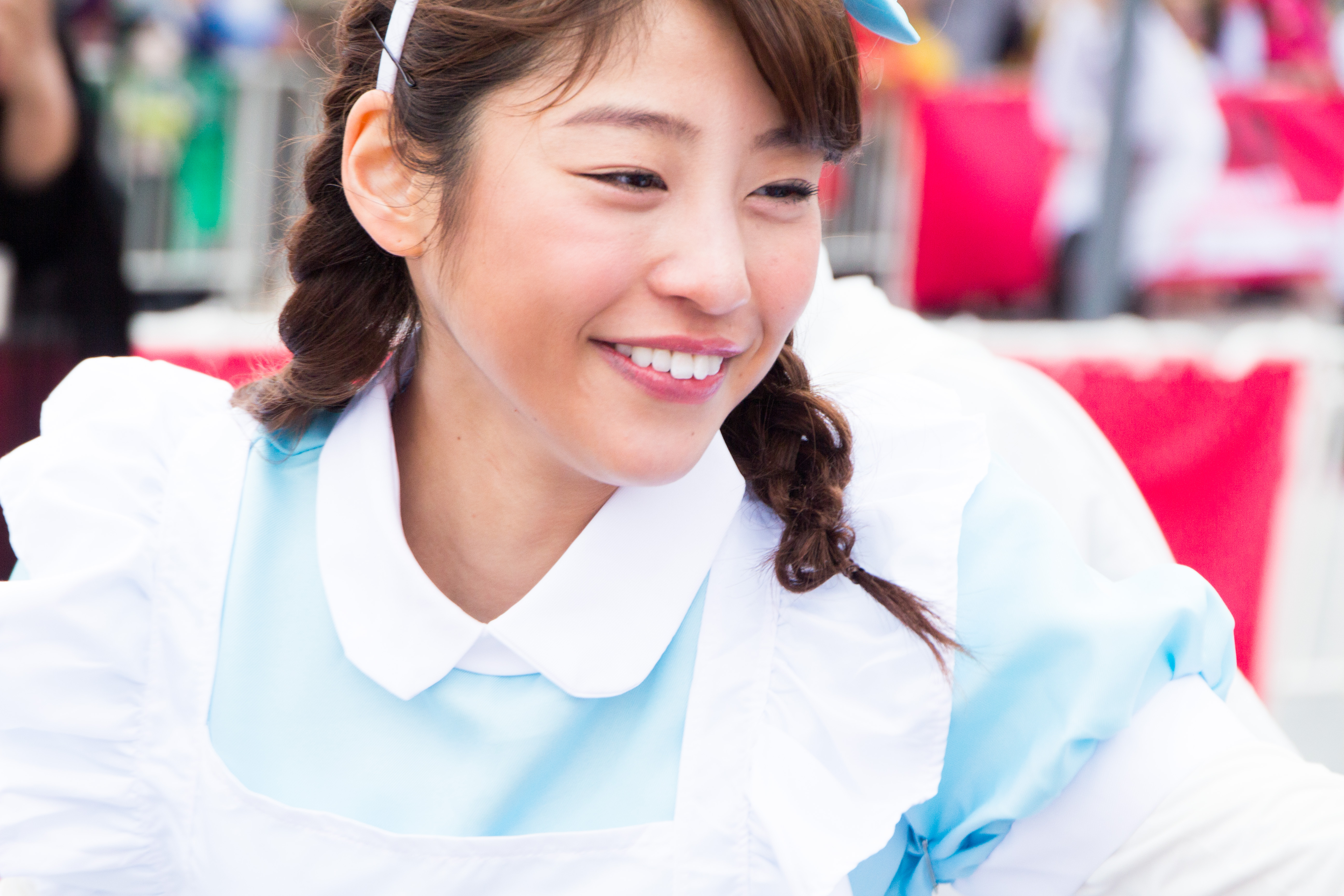
- Born: 29 July 1992 (age 33); Tondabayashi, Osaka, Japan
- Education: Waseda School of Culture, Media and Society
- Alma mater: Waseda University
- Occupations: Television announcer, news presenter, tarento
- Years active: 2012–
- Agent: cent. Force
- Height: 1.64 m (5 ft 4 1/2 in)
- Spouse: Naoya Gamou (m. 2022)

Maki Okazoe (岡副 麻希, Okazoe Maki; born 29 July 1992 in Tondabayashi, Osaka) is a Japanese TV announcer, news presenter and tarento. She is represented by her agency cent. Force.

== Life and career ==
Okazoe attended the Osaka Tōin Junior and Senior High School and Waseda University with a degree in Creative Writing and Criticism at the School of Culture, Media and Society. She participated in the "2011 Miss Waseda Contest" beauty pageant in her 1st year at Waseda and was active as a fashion model during her college years.

She signed with the agency, Sprout Co, in 2014 and became the regular weather presenter for the news program Mezamashi TV at Fuji TV.

In March 2015, Okazoe graduated from Waseda University and moved to Sprout Co's parent company and agency, cent. Force. She is the weather presenter for Mezamashi Saturday as well as moving to become the regular sports presenter for Mezamashi TV in October.

In March 2016, Okazoe appeared on her first television commercial with Konami for the mobile game Professional Baseball Spirits A.

Okazoe was ranked 4th in Oricon's The 12th Most Liked Weather Caster Ranking List, and gained popularity while appearing on many variety shows. She continued to thrive in the industry as a TV announcer and news caster, specializing in weather and sports.

In 2019, she expanded her field of career to include radio talk show with her own radio program on Nippon Cultural Broadcasting called Okazoe Maki no Hokuhokuta Imu, which broadcasts every Thursday night.

On 6 April 2022, she married with a racing driver Naoya Gamou.

== Character ==
- Interests are reading historical fiction novels, taking strolls, going to pet stores.
- She has around 15 years of experience in swimming and water polo. She was a part of the swimming club and the finswimming club at Waseda University. She was the winner of the 2012, 24th Japan National Finswimming Representatives Competition – 1500m Women's Bifin. She was also featured on the cover of the manga magazine Big Comic Spirits, wearing competitive swimwear in 2014. In addition to finswimming, she also does long-distance swimming as a hobby.
- She's been called the "Way too tanned news caster" and "Way too tanned announcer" for her naturally tanned skin color. Some of her other nicknames include "The tanned Mirei Kiritani" and "Female Shigeru Matsuzaki".
- She is very flexible and is able to do a perfect 180-degree split. Her flexibility was a trending topic when she performed it on Mezamashi TV. She also demonstrated her flexibility in the ball opening ceremony at a Chiba Lotte Marines game.
- Her inspirations are the former sportscaster and tennis player, Shuzo Matsuoka, and journalist and TV announcer, Maya Kobayashi.
- Her high school classmates included Sayuri Matsumura from the idol group Nogizaka46 and pro baseball player Naoya Emura from the Chiba Lotte Marines.
- She is a high school baseball fan and attends the Koshien and the Meiji Jingu Baseball Tournament as a fan every year.
- In elementary school, she was ranked 1st in her class' "Biggest airhead ranking list".

== Media ==
=== Television ===
==== Current Programs ====
- Mezamashi Saturday (めざましどようび) (Fuji TV, 2015–) – Presenter (weather, sports), reporter
- Tenshoku Search, Chidori's Job Lovers (天職サーチ 千鳥のジョブラバーズ) (ABC TV, 2018–)
- SUPER GT+ (TV Tokyo, 2019–) – Reporter

==== Past Programs ====
- Mezamashi TV Aqua (めざましテレビアクア) (Fuji TV, 2014/09–2016/04) – Presenter (weather, sports)
- Mezamashi TV (めざましテレビ) (Fuji TV, 2014/09–2017/09) – Presenter (sports)
- Shingo Murakami and the Gods of Sports (村上信五とスポーツの神様たち) (Fuji TV, 2017/08)
- Katteni! Japan Guide (勝手に!JAPANガイド) (BS Fuji, 2018/10–2019/03)

=== Radio ===
- Okazoe Maki no Hokuhokuta Imu (岡副麻希のほくほくたいむ) (NCB, 2019–)
- What's JOGIN (FM Fuji, 2013/05)

=== Web TV ===
- Glorious! AbemaTV Awards (輝け！AbemaTV AWARDS) (AbemaTV, 2018/12/30) – Assistant

=== Video games ===
- Pro Baseball Spirits A (プロ野球スピリッツA) (Konami, 2016) – Secretary

=== Commercials ===
- Konami Pro Baseball Spirits A (プロ野球スピリッツA) (2016/03–)

=== Magazines ===
- Weekly Big Comic Spirits (週刊ビッグコミックスピリッツ) (2014/10/27, 2016/05/16) – Cover
- Weekly Playboy (週刊プレイボーイ) (2016/05/30) – Cover

=== Photobooks ===
- Maki Mermaid (Shogakukan, 2018/02/05)
