= Cent. Force =

Japanese talent agency

cent. Force CO., LTD
- Native name: 株式会社セント・フォース
- Type: Kabushiki gaisha (Joint-stock company)
- Traded as: Unlisted
- Industry: Service industry (entertainment)
- Genre: Newscaster and Tarento management
- Founded: July 1994
- Headquarters: Neonat Annex 502, 4-Chome 1-22, Ebisu, Shibuya, Tokyo, Japan; ZIP 150-0013
- Area served: Japan
- Key people: Miharu Kubochi (Representative chairman)
- Subsidiaries: Sprout Co., Ltd
- Website: www.centforce.com

cent. Force Co., Ltd (株式会社セント・フォース) is a Japanese talent agency headquartered in Ebisu, Shibuya, Tokyo. It was founded in 1994 and focuses on talent management for newscasters and tarento.

== Overview ==
The primary talents the agency holds are freelance announcers, casters and reporters. The company holds a subsidiary talent agency, Sprout Co., Ltd, which focuses on talent management for students at a college level. Sprout was formerly a part of cent. Force until 2012, when the agency split to become a subsidiary.

In 2016, the company extended operations with a new branch in the Kansai region.

== Notable talents ==
=== Tarento/Casters ===
- Elina Arai
- Maki Okazoe
- Aiko Kaitou
- Hiromi Kawata (former Yomiuri TV)
- Mitsuyo Kusano (former NHK, TBS)
- Reiko Shiota (former badminton player)
- Aya Shibata (former SKE48)
- Mai Shinuchi (former Nogizaka46)
- Mika Sugisaki (former SBC)
- Junko Yaginuma
- Marie Yanaka

=== Others ===
- Kei Igarashi (basketball player)
- Takashi Usami (association football player)
- Tatsuya Masushima (association football player)
- Mana Iwabuchi (association football player)
- Ayane Kurihara (badminton player)
