= Yuumi =

Yuumi is a Japanese feminine given name. It is distinct from the Japanese given name Yumi, which has a short "u".

It may be written:

- With two kanji, one read yu and another read umi (e.g. 遊海)
- With two kanji, one read yū and another read mi (e.g 友美, 優実)
- With three kanji read yu, u, and mi (e.g. 由宇美)
- In hiragana (ゆうみ)

People with this name include:

- Yuumi Kasai (河西 結心; born 2003), Japanese member of the Camellia Factory
- Yuumi Kato (加藤 遊海; born 1996), Japanese model who represented Japan at Miss Universe 2018
- Yuumi Kawai (河合 優実; born 2000), Japanese actress
- Yūmi Nagashima (永島 優美; born 1991), Japanese former announcer
- Yuumi Shida (志田 友美; born 1997), Japanese model and actress
- Yuumi Koseki (小関 優実; born 2004), Japanese singer, former member of SGO48
- Yūmi Yoshikawa (吉川 有美; born 1973), Japanese politician

Fictional characters with this name include:

- Yuumi, the Magical Cat, a League of Legends character voiced in English by Cassandra Lee Morris
