= Shibuya Junior and Senior High School =

Private secondary school in Shibuya, Tokyo, Japan

- 渋谷教育学園渋谷中学高等学校

Location
- Shibuya Ward, Tokyo; Japan; 35°39′50.1″N 139°42′10.9″E

Information
- Other name: Shibu-shibu (渋渋)
- School type: Private Secondary school
- Motto: 自調自考 (Seek and Think for Oneself)
- Established: 1924
- Founder: Shigeru Koike; Keizō Koike
- Sister school: Makuhari Junior and Senior High School; Waseda Shibuya Senior High School
- Grades: 7–12
- Gender: Mixed
- Age: 12 to 18
- Website: www.shibushibu.jp

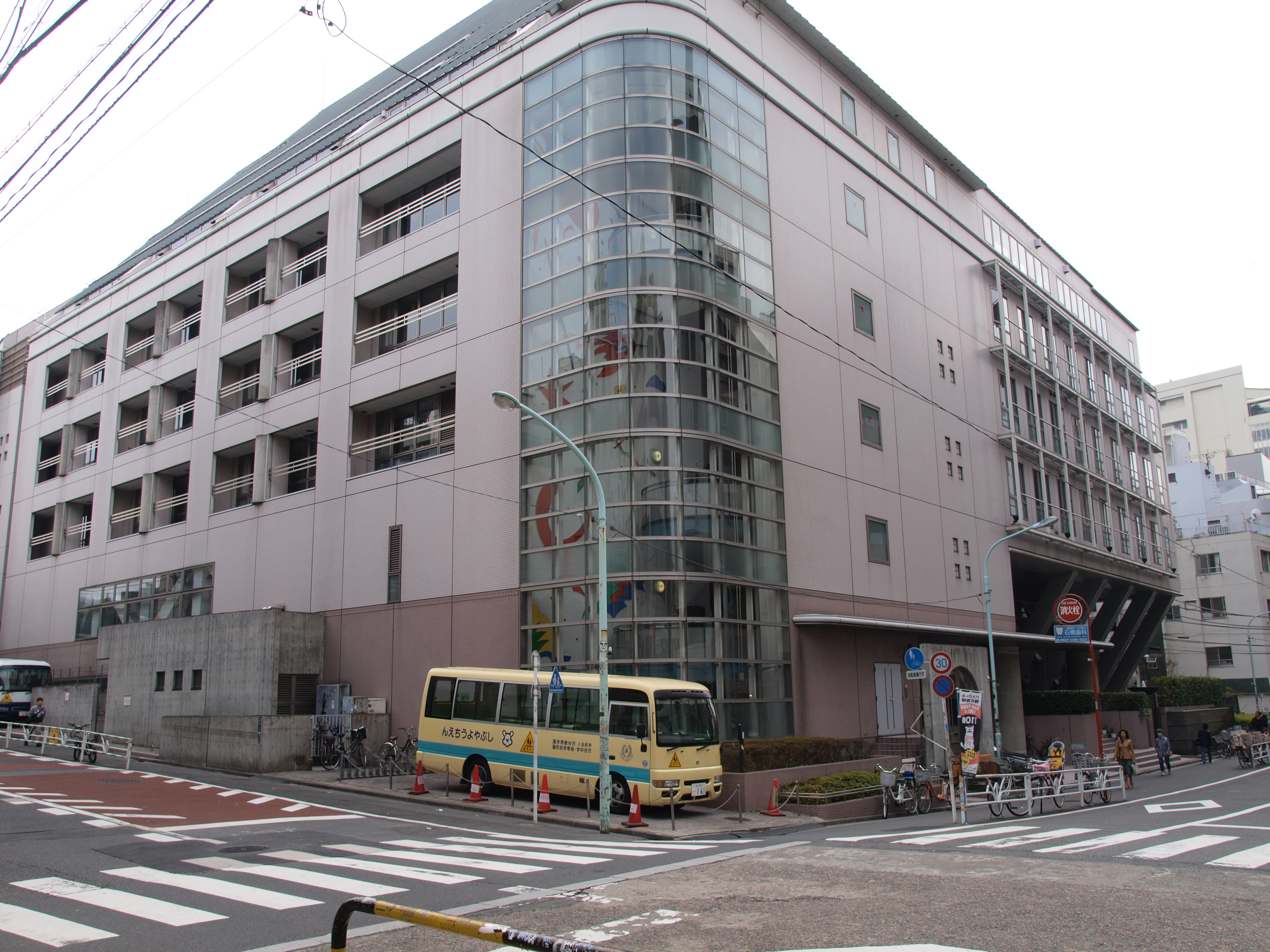
Shibuya Junior and Senior High School in Shibuya, Tokyo

Shibuya Junior and Senior High School (渋谷教育学園渋谷中学高等学校, Shibuya Kyōiku Gakuen Shibuya Chūgaku Kōtōgakkō), is a private secondary school in Shibuya, Tokyo, Japan, offering integrated junior and senior high school education.

The school is commonly abbreviated as Shibu-shibu (渋渋). It is a six-year integrated secondary school that does not admit students directly into the senior high school section.

The school shares its educational philosophy with its sister school, Makuhari Junior and Senior High School.

== History ==
The school was founded in 1924 as Chūō Girls' School (中央女学校) by businessman Shigeru Koike and Keizō Koike. Originally located in Izumi, in what is now Suginami, the school offered four-year and two-year courses in general education and sewing, respectively. The school was temporarily closed in 1933 before reopening the following year at its present location in Shibuya under the name Shibuya Practical Commercial Girls' School (渋谷商業実践女学校).

In 1943, the school merged with Aisen Girls' School and Tōyō Home Economics Girls' School and was renamed Shibuya Girls' Commercial School (渋谷女子商業学校). Following the postwar education reforms, it became Shibuya Girls' High School (渋谷高等女学校) in 1946, while a junior high school was also established. A senior high school was established in 1948, initially including a coeducational part-time program. The junior high school and part-time program were subsequently suspended and later reorganized as separate girls' institutions.

In 1963, the senior high school was renamed Shibuya Girls' Senior High School (渋谷女子高等学校). The school entered into an educational partnership with Tamura Gakuen in 1962, and Tetsuo Tamura, who later became chairman of Shibuya Education Academy, subsequently played a central role in the school's development.

The present school was established in 1996 as part of a reorganization intended to implement in Shibuya the educational practices developed at the sister school Makuhari Junior and Senior High School. The new institution, Shibuya Junior and Senior High School (渋谷中学高等学校), was established as a coeducational six-year integrated secondary school. The former Shibuya Girls' Junior and Senior High School continued to operate during the transition and closed in 2001.

The school completed construction of a new school building in February 1996. A second gymnasium was completed in October 2006, and a former campus building of The British School in Tokyo was opened as a second school building in April 2024.

== Academics and activities ==
The school places a strong emphasis on international education. It was designated a Super Global High School (SGH) by the Ministry of Education, Culture, Sports, Science and Technology (MEXT). Approximately 15% of the student body consists of students who have previously lived and been educated outside Japan.Returnee students admitted through the school's English-language returnee admissions track receive specialized English instruction based on the educational practices of schools in North America, including courses in literature, writing, and world history taught primarily by native English-speaking teachers. The school has also been noted for being one of the first in Japan to allow students who spend a full academic year studying abroad to graduate within the standard three-year senior high school period. As part of its educational philosophy of 自調自考 (jichō jikō), translated as “Seek and Think for Oneself”, the school holds regular lectures by the chancellor. The lectures address themes related to personal development and the formation of students' identities.

Graduates attend universities in Japan and overseas, with the school's published results listing admissions to institutions including the University of Tokyo, Kyoto University, and a range of universities in the United States, Canada, the United Kingdom, and elsewhere.

In 2024, UESHIMA MUSEUM opened in the Ueshima Tower, a facility built on part of the former campus of The British School in Tokyo. The museum displays a collection of contemporary art assembled by Mikuro Ueshima, an alumnus of Makuhari Junior and Senior High School.

An affiliated school, Shibuya Kindergarten, operated by Shibuya Education Academy, is located adjacent to the school and shares some facilities with it.

== Notable alumni ==
- Misato Nakamura – judo practitioner and 2008 Summer Olympics bronze medalist in the women's 52 kg category.
- Sarah Asahina – judo practitioner.
- Kana Watanabe – judo practitioner and mixed martial arts fighter.
- Beni Takemata – Fuji Television announcer and former shogi player.
- Erina Iwata – Nippon Television announcer and freelance announcer.

== See also ==
- List of high schools in Tokyo
- Secondary education in Japan
