= Hida-Furukawa Station =

Railway station in Hida, Gifu Prefecture, Japan

Hida-Furukawa Station 飛騨古川駅
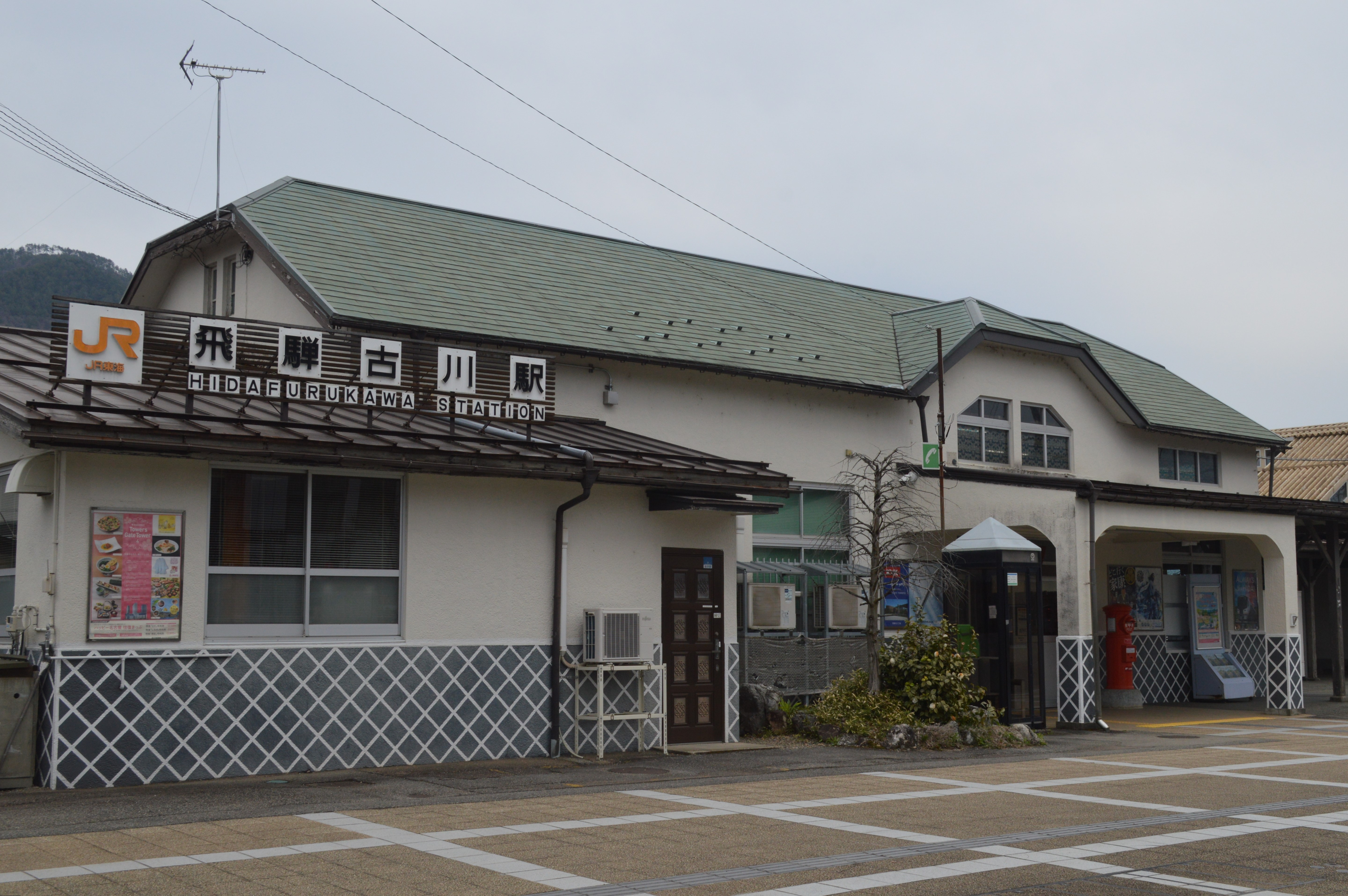
- Hida-Furukawa Station in 2023

General information
- Location: Furukawa-cho, Kanamori-cho, Hida-shi, Gifu-ken 509-4225; Japan
- Coordinates: 36°14′12″N 137°11′23″E
- Operator: JR Central
- Line: Takayama Main Line
- Distance: 151.3 km from Gifu
- Platforms: 1 side + 1 island platform
- Tracks: 3

Other information
- Status: Staffed (Midori no Madoguchi)

History
- Opened: October 25, 1934; 91 years ago
Location
- Location within Gifu Prefecture Location within Japan

Hida-Furukawa Station (飛騨古川駅, Hida-Furukawa-eki) is a railway station on the Takayama Main Line in the city of Hida, Gifu Prefecture, Japan, operated by Central Japan Railway Company (JR Central).

== Lines ==
Hida-Furukawa Station is served by the Takayama Main Line linking Gifu in Gifu Prefecture with Toyama in Toyama Prefecture. It is located 151.3 kilometers from the official starting point of the line at Gifu.

== Layout ==
The station has one ground-level side platform and one island platform, connected by a footbridge. The station has a Midori no Madoguchi staffed ticket office.

=== Platforms ===
1	■ Takayama Main Line	for Toyama for Takayama and Gero
2, 3	■ Takayama Main Line	for Takayama and Gero

== Adjacent stations ==
«	Service	»
Takayama Main Line
Hida-Kokufu	Local	Sugisaki
Takayama	Limited Express Hida	Inotani or Terminus

== History ==
The station opened on 25 October 1934. With the privatization of Japanese National Railways (JNR) on 1 April 1987, the station came under the control of JR Central.

== Surrounding area ==
- National Route 41
- Hida City Office
- Hida City Library
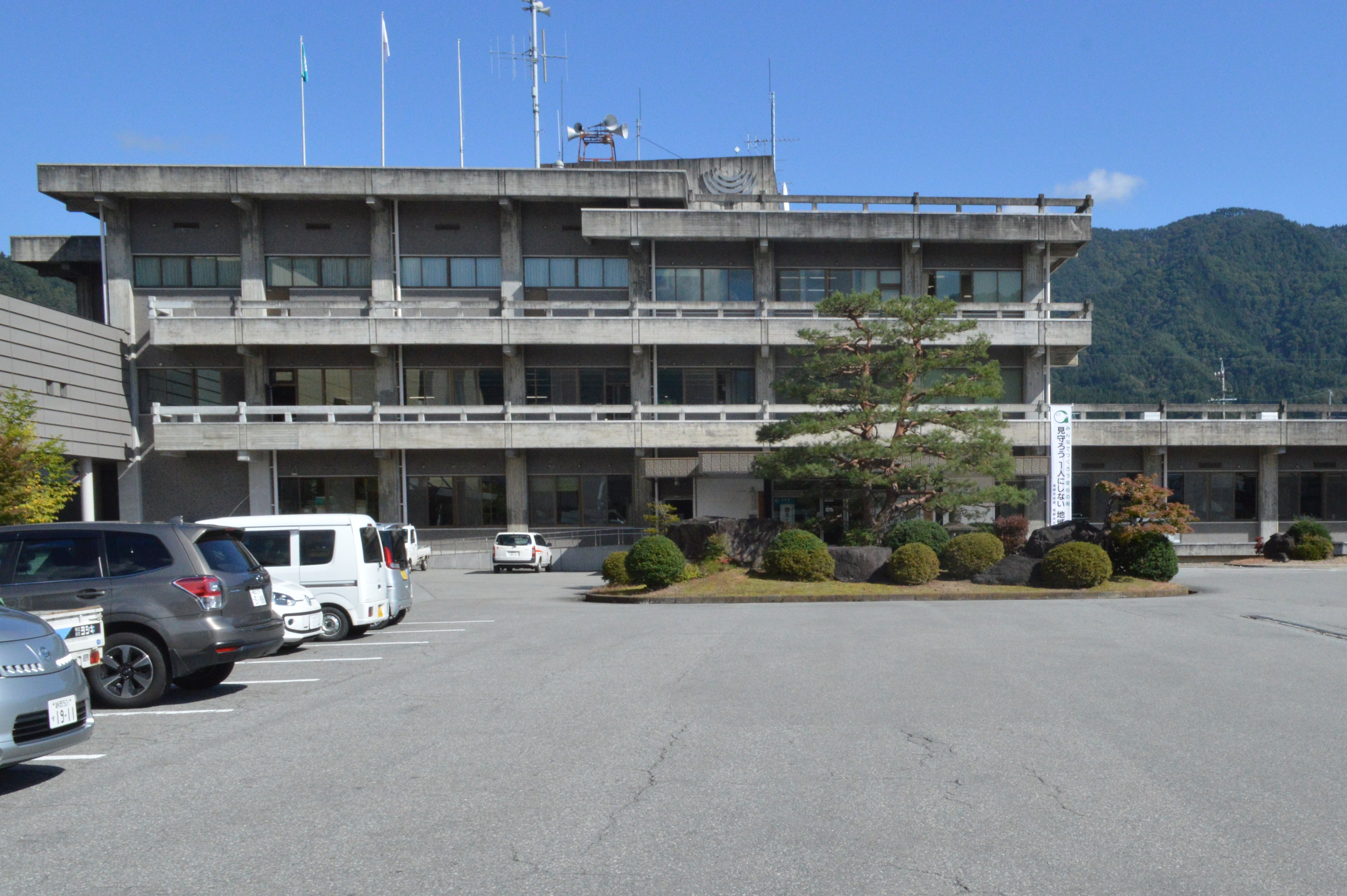
Hida City Office in October 2016

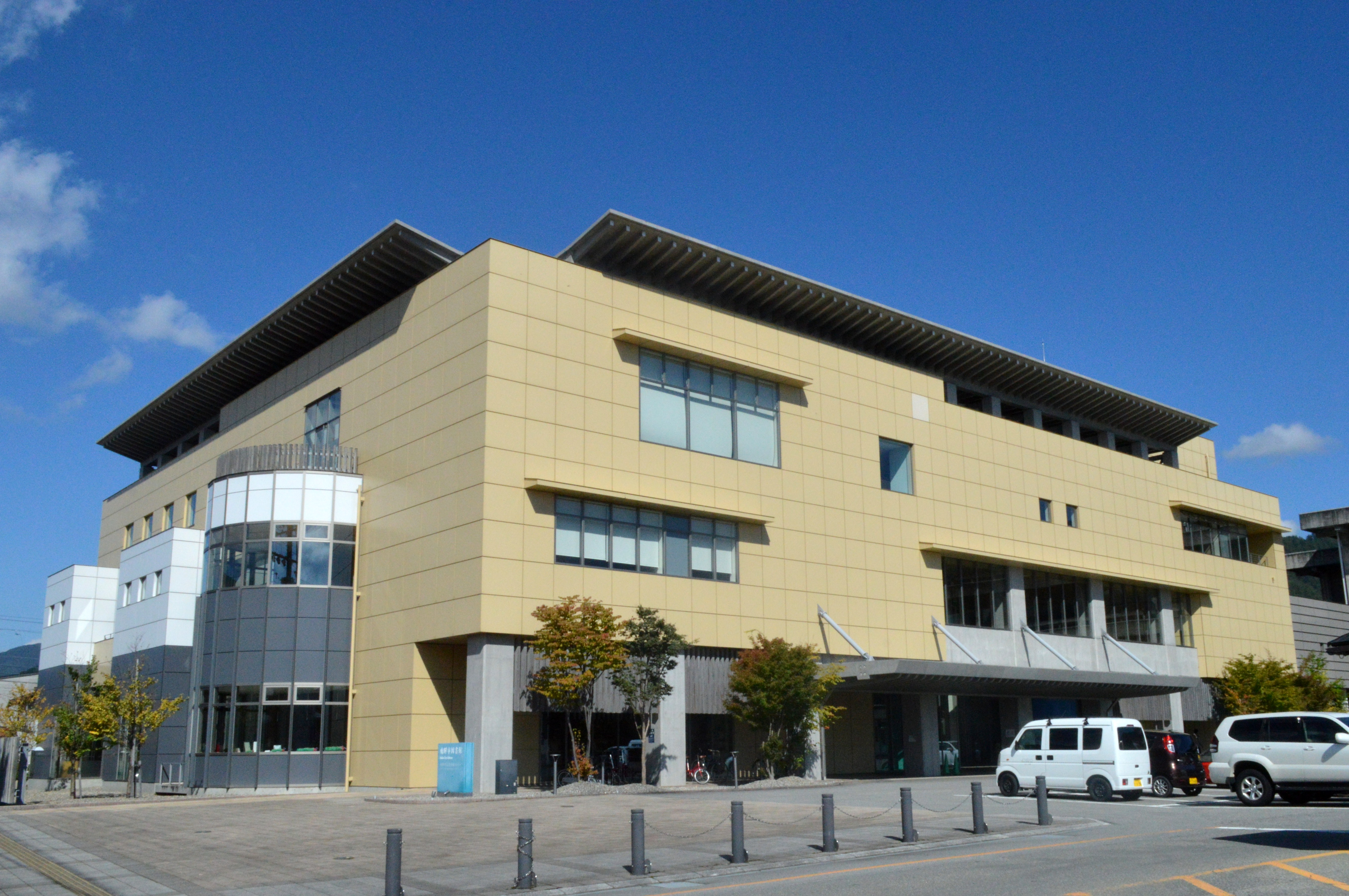
Hida City Library in October 2016

== In popular culture ==
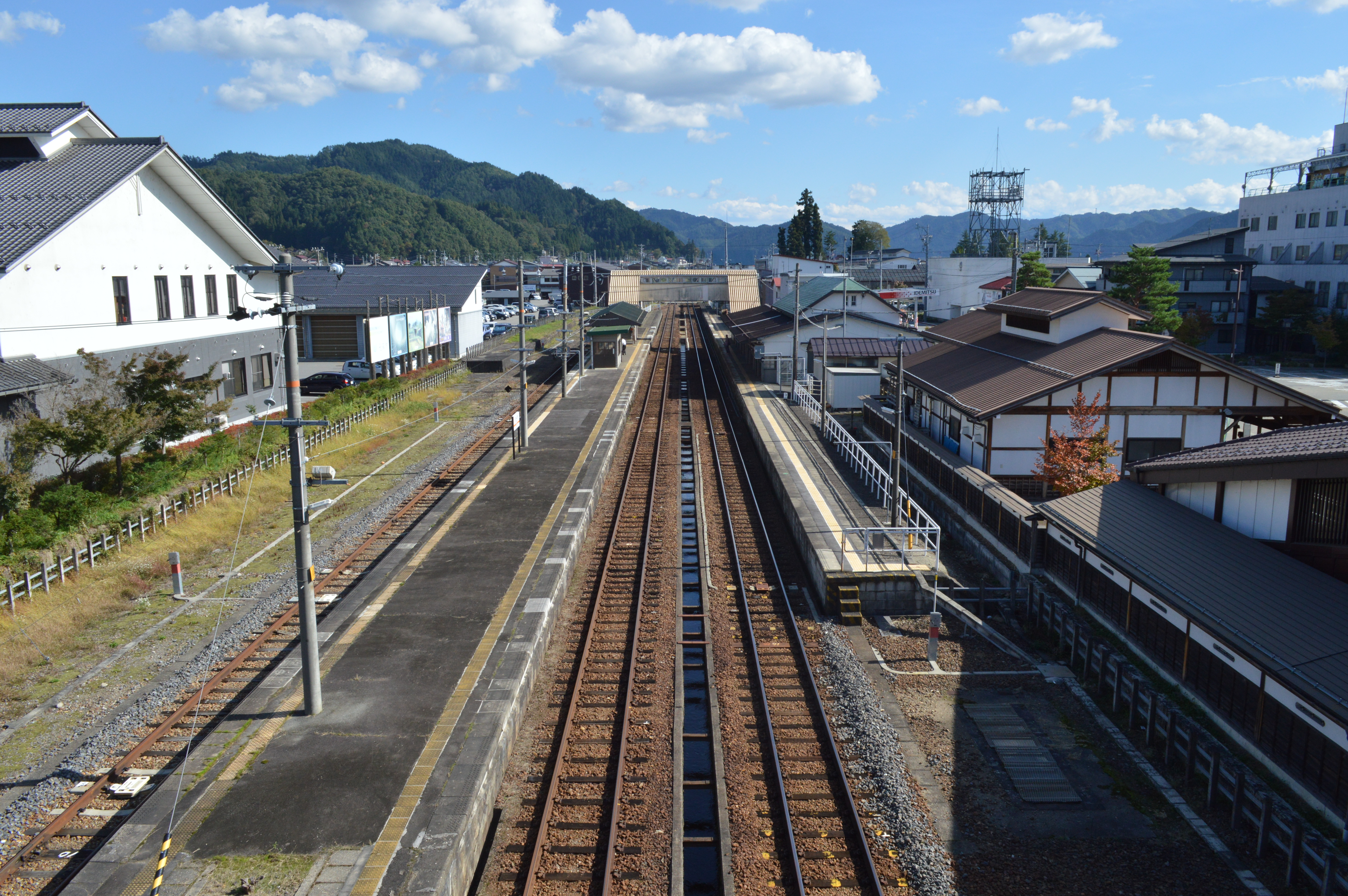
The view of the station platforms from the same position as portrayed in the film Your Name

The station appeared in the 2016 animated film Your Name.

== See also ==
- List of railway stations in Japan
