= Masaya Emura =

Japanese baseball player

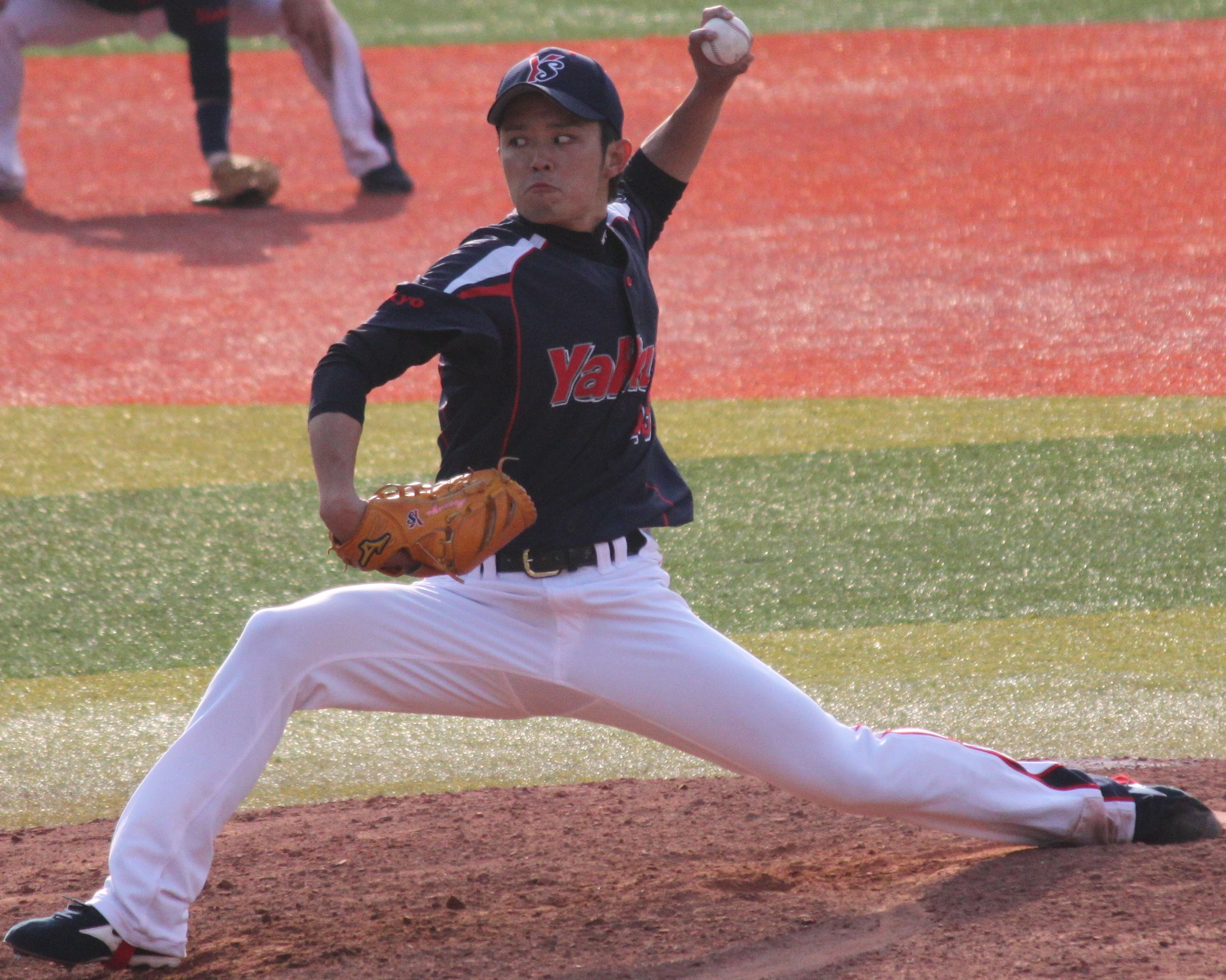
- Pitcher
- Born: July 5, 1987 (age 38); Fukuyama, Hiroshima, Japan
- Batted: Left Threw: Left

NPB debut
- April 18, 2013, for the Tokyo Yakult Swallows

Last NPB appearance
- August 26, 2014, for the Tokyo Yakult Swallows

NPB statistics
- Win–loss record: 3-1
- Earned run average: 5.53
- Strikeouts: 37
- Saves: 0
- Holds: 7
- Stats at Baseball Reference

Teams
- Tokyo Yakult Swallows (2013–2015); Fukushima Hopes (2016)

Masaya Emura (江村 将也, Emura Masaya; born July 5, 1987, in Fukuyama, Hiroshima, Japan) is a professional Japanese baseball player. He plays pitcher for the Fukushima Hopes.

His younger brother Naoya is also a professional baseball player currently playing for Chiba Lotte Marines.
