= Osaka Tōin Junior and Senior High School =

- 大阪桐蔭中学校・高等学校
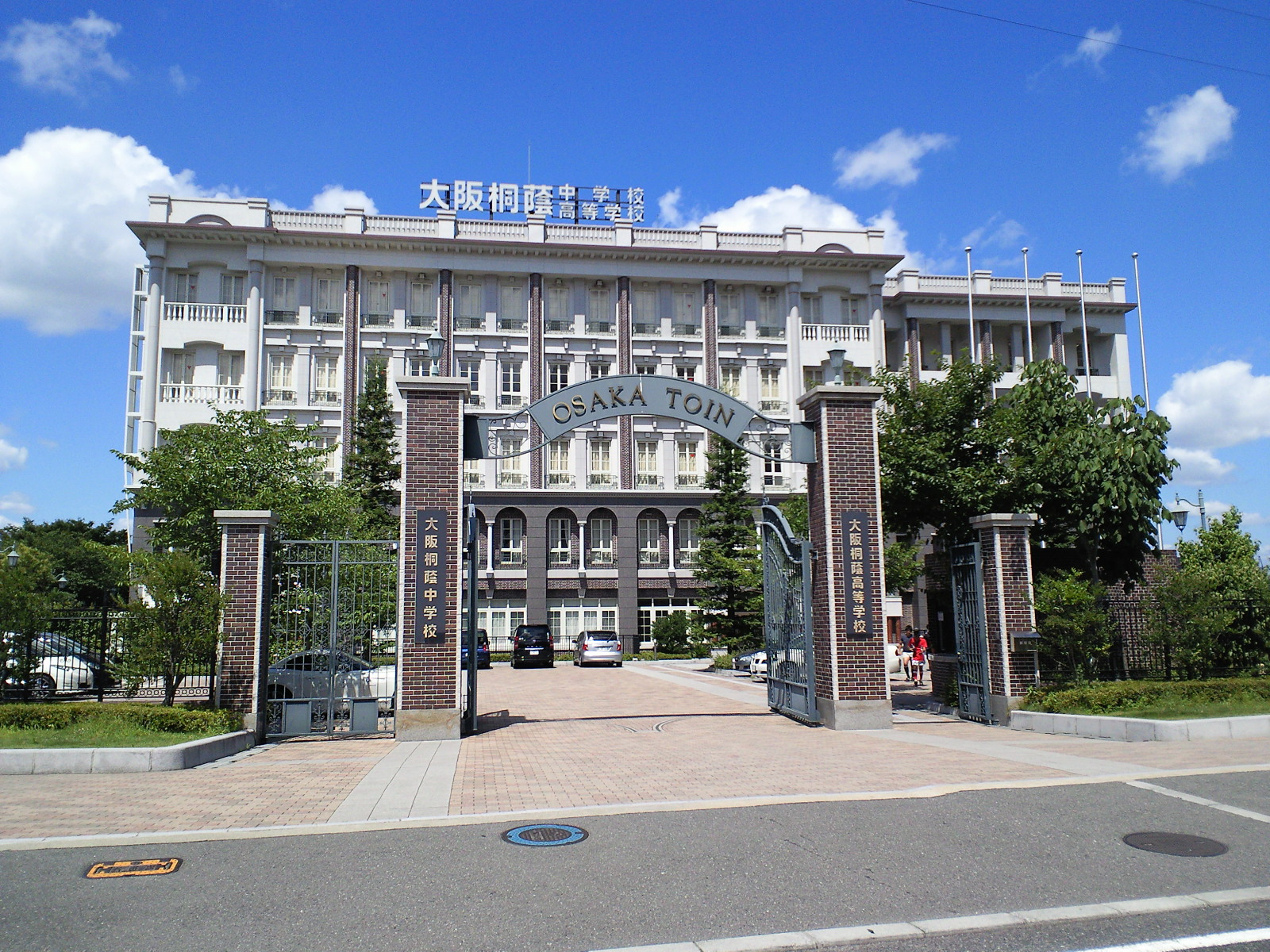
- Main building

Location
- Daitō City, Osaka Prefecture; 574-0013; Japan; 34°42′27.4″N 135°38′18.6″E

Information
- Type: Private
- Established: 1983 (high school); 1995 (junior high school)
- Founder: Osaka Sangyo University
- Gender: co-educational
- Integration: Integrated JHS/HS
- School code: 27593A
- Website: www.osakatoin.ed.jp

Osaka Tōin Junior and Senior High School (Japanese: 大阪桐蔭中学校・高等学校, Hepburn: Ōsaka Tōin Chūgakkō, Kōtōgakkō) is a private co-educational junior and senior high school located in Daitō City, Osaka Prefecture, Japan. The high school was founded in 1983 by Osaka Sangyo University.

== History ==
Osaka Tōin Senior High School was founded as the Daitō campus of Osaka Sangyo University Senior High School in 1983, during a period of rapid increase in the number of high school students in Japan. The school commenced with 150 students enrolled in two streams; a regular course and dedicated physical education course. The school became independent from Osaka Sangyo University Senior High School in 1988 and an integrated junior high school was opened in 1995.

== Streams ==
=== Senior high school ===
Stream I
For students aiming at entering Tokyo University, Kyoto University, or the medical school of other national universities. From second year students focus on either science or arts. Students progressing from Osaka Toin Junior High School generally enter stream I.

Stream II
For students aiming at entering high-level national universities. From second year students focus on either science or arts.

Stream III
A stream for students focussed on physical education or music. There are 7–8 less classes per week compared to streams I and II, allowing extra time for club activities (members of the brass band club receive 9 classes per week in music theory and practice).

=== Junior high school ===
English and mathematics specialisation stream
For students aiming to enter Tokyo University, Kyoto University, or the medical school of other national universities.
English and mathematics stream
For students aiming at entering top-level national universities.

== Academics and educational philosophy ==
The school operates on a six-year integrated education model (一貫教育), providing a continuous curriculum from junior high through senior high school. The academic streams are designed to prepare students for university entrance examinations, including those for national universities and medical schools.

== Academics and educational philosophy ==
The school operates on a six-year integrated education model (一貫教育), providing a continuous curriculum from junior high through senior high school. The academic streams are designed to prepare students for university entrance examinations, including those for national universities and medical schools.

== lub activities ==
=== Baseball ===
The school's baseball club was formed in 1988. In 1991, only the club's fourth year of existence, Osaka Tōin participated in the spring invitational tournament for the first time. The school advanced to the quarter-finals, with the highlight of the tournament being ace Yukihiko Wada pitching a no-hit, shutout in the first round match against Sendai Ikuei High School. In the same year, the school won the "Summer Koshien" national championships, defeating Okinawa Fisheries High School 13-8 in the final. Osaka Tōin was the 14th school to win the championship in their first year of qualifying for the tournament. Wada and future Yomiuri Giants member Yoshihiro Seo pitched in the championship match against Okinawa Fisheries ace Rin Ōno; fellow future Yomiuri Giant Makoto Hagiwara hit the only home run of the match.

The school won its second national championship in 2008, defeating Shizuoka Prefecture's Tokoha Kikukgawa Senior High School 17-0 in the final.

In 2012, Osaka Tōin became the seventh school in history to win the spring invitational and summer national tournaments in the same year, defeating Aomori Prefecture's Kōsei Gakuin in the final of both tournaments. It was the first time that two schools met in the final of both tournaments in the same year. Future Hanshin Tigers ace Shintaro Fujinami was the star of the tournament, pitching shutouts in both the semi-final and final. In the autumn of 2012, Osaka Tōin was joint-champion of the National Sports Festival along with Sendai Ikuei, becoming the third school in history to win the "triple crown" in one year. Lost time due to rain earlier in the tournament forced tournament organizers to announce that the winners of the two semi-finals would be named joint champions.

At the 2014 summer tournament, the school won for the fourth time, defeating Mie High School 4-3 in the final.

In 2018 Osaka Toin became the third team ever to back-to-back titles of Spring Invitational Tournament in Koshien, since the same team won in the year before.

Former members of the Osaka Toin baseball team have played for eleven of the twelve Japanese professional baseball teams (see list of alumni below). Sho Nakata and Tsuyoshi Nishioka have played on the Japan national team and Nishioka spent two seasons with the Minnesota Twins of the MLB.

==== List of Koshien Championships ====
List of Koshien championships
Number	Year	Edition	Season
1	1991	73rd	Summer Koshien
2	2008	90th	Summer Koshien
3	2012	84th	Spring Koshien
4	2012	94th	Summer Koshien
5	2014	96th	Summer Koshien
6	2017	89th	Spring Koshien
7	2018	90th	Spring Koshien
8	2018	100th	Summer Koshien
9	2022	94th	Spring Koshien

=== Brass band ===
The brass band club was formed in 2005 and in the same year took the gold prize at the Kansai Brass Band Contest. In 2006 and 2007, the band represented the Kansai region in the high school division of the All-Japan Band Competition, taking the silver award on both occasions. In 2008 the band did not qualify for the national competition, but returned in 2009 and won their first gold award. The band continued this success with consecutive wins at the 2010 and 2011 competitions. In 2008 the band also won silver in its first appearance at the All Japan Marching Contest. It followed this with by winning gold at the 2009 and 2010 events. As a result of this success, the band receives many requests for public performances and is well known throughout Japan despite its short history.

=== Soccer ===
The school's soccer club was founded in 2005. It qualified for the soccer tournament of the national high school sports championships in 2007 and reached the quarter-finals of the same tournament in 2008. The club also qualified for the 2008 All Japan High School Soccer Tournament and advanced to the second round.

The girls' soccer club was formed in 2006. It has qualified for the national championships several times since its first appearance in 2007; in 2011 the club finished runners-up, losing to Tokiwagi Gakuen High School LSC 1–3 in the final.

=== Rugby ===
The school rugby club was formed in 1988. In 1995, it qualified for the National High School Rugby Tournament for the first time. In 2013 the club won the 14th Spring Invitational Tournament, its first championship win at the national level, defeating Tokai University Gyosei High School 33-14 in the final. In 2015 the club were runners-up in the spring invitational tournament, this time losing to Tokai Gyosei 0–21 in the final.

=== Golf ===
In 1999 the boys' golf team won the 20th annual All Japan High School Golf Tournament.

=== Basketball ===
The boys' and girls' basketball teams each made their first appearance at the summer All Japan High School Basketball Tournament in 2014, with the boys' team advancing to the second round and the girls' team advancing to the third round. The girls' team also qualified for the "Winter Cup" tournament for the first time in 2014.

=== Track and field ===
The track and field club was formed in 2011 as the "ekiden" club. The club changed its name to the track and field club in the following year. In November 2013 the club won the Osaka Prefecture ekiden qualification race and finished 22nd in the national championship in the following month.

== Campus and facilities ==
The school's campus includes facilities to support its integrated junior and senior high school programs. Athletic infrastructure includes a baseball stadium, indoor training centers, and weight-training rooms. Academic facilities on the campus include science laboratories and a library.

== Controversies ==
- In August 2007 the school was caught up in the scandal involving high schools embellishing the numbers of students that were successful in top-level university entrance exams. Whilst it was confirmed that the school had inflated numbers, the true results were not revealed. Yomiuri Shimbun reported that 16 students sat a combined total of 98 entrance exams, passing 88 of them; the increased passing rate could then be used in promotional material.
- In March 2015 it was revealed that the school administration had been diverting income into a slush fund and that such improper accounting practices had been taking place for approximately twenty years. The majority of the funds came from tuition paid by the parents of students and overcharging for practice examinations and materials such as textbooks. The funds were diverted into various accounts including those of the school's first principal Shin'ichi Moriyama and his daughter, and were estimated to exceed 500 million yen. The funds were reported to have been spent on taxi fares, dining and alcohol, expenses for entertaining managers of local "juku" cram schools, golf equipment, high-class brand-name bags and clothing, and other gifts. In response, the Osaka Prefectural Government announced in March 2015 that it would reduce the subsidy given to Osaka Sangyo University in the 2015 financial year by 20 percent, from the 660 million yen provided for in the prefecture's annual budget, as punishment for the "malicious misappropriation of funds that should have been repaid to parents". In April 2015, the Osaka Sangyo University Teachers' Union filed a criminal complaint to Osaka prefectural police against Moriyama and the school's former administrator, who allegedly managed the transfer of funds into Moriyama's accounts.

== Reputation and legacy ==
Osaka Tōin is noted for its high school baseball program. The school has won multiple championships in the Summer Koshien and Spring Invitational tournaments, establishing a record for combined titles in the modern era of the competition. Due to this athletic success, the school serves as a frequent feeder program for Nippon Professional Baseball (NPB), with numerous alumni selected in the annual professional draft.

== Notable alumni ==
=== Professional baseball ===
- Hideto Asamura (Class of 2008) – Tohoku Rakuten Golden Eagles infielder.
- Naoya Emura (2010) – Former Chiba Lotte Marines catcher.
- Yoshiyuki Fuchiwaki (1992) – Former Osaka Kintetsu Buffaloes infielder.
- Shintaro Fujinami (2012) – Baltimore Orioles pitcher.
- Makoto Hagiwara (1991) – Former Hanshin Tigers and Osaka Kintetsu Buffaloes infielder.
- Ryosuke Hirata (2005) – Former Chunichi Dragons outfielder.
- Shinji Imanaka (1988) – Former Chunichi Dragons pitcher.
- Minoru Iwata (2001) – Former Hanshin Tigers pitcher.
- Takashi Kawai (1994) – Former Chiba Lotte Marines and Tohoku Rakuten Golden Eagles pitcher.
- Toshiyuki Kitagawa (1996) – Former Yokohama BayStars infielder.
- Kenichi Marumo (2006) – Former Yomiuri Giants and Orix Buffaloes infielder.
- Keisuke Mizuta (1998) – Former infielder for the Saitama Seibu Lions, Hanshin Tigers, Chunichi Dragons and Tokyo Yakult Swallows.
- Tomoya Mori (2013) – Orix Buffaloes catcher.
- Satoru Morimoto (1995) – Former Fukuoka SoftBank Hawks infielder.
- Takeya Nakamura (2001) – Saitama Seibu Lions infielder.
- Sho Nakata (2007) – Chunichi Dragons outfielder/infielder.
- Naoto Nishida (2011) – Former Hanshin Tigers infielder.
- Tsuyoshi Nishioka (2002) – Former Chiba Lotte Marines, Minnesota Twins and Hanshin Tigers infielder.
- Masatoshi Okada (2007) – Saitama Seibu Lions catcher.
- Masashi Sajikihara (2000) – Former Hanshin Tigers and Saitama Seibu Lions pitcher.
- Yoshihiro Seo (1991) – Former Osaka Kintetsu Buffaloes and Yomiuri Giants pitcher.
- Shion Matsuo (2022) - Yokohama DeNA BayStars catcher.
- Akira Neo (2018) - Chunichi Dragons pitcher/infielder/outfielder.
- Ren Kakigi (2018) - Hokkaido Nippon-Ham Fighters pitcher.
- Yugo Maeda (2023) - Fukuoka SoftBank Hawks pitcher.

=== Other sports ===
- Hiroyuki Abe – professional soccer player with Gamba Osaka.
- Nao Eguchi – professional soccer player with Blaublitz Akita.
- Takayuki Fukumura – professional soccer player with Kyoto Sanga F.C. and Shimizu S-Pulse.
- Tomonori Imagawa - professional basketball player
- Yuji Kitagawa (2005) – professional rugby player for the Panasonic Wild Knights, Kamaishi Seawaves and the Japan national team.
- Mitsuru Mansho – professional soccer player with Mito HollyHock and Fujieda MYFC.
- Kimihiro Minamide – professional golfer and son of comedian All Kyojin.
- Genta Miura – professional soccer player Shimizu S-Pulse.
- Kiyoshi and Yūsaku Miyazato – professional golfers and brothers of fellow golfer Ai Miyazato.
- Yuya Morimoto – professional golfer.
- Tadasuke Nishihara – professional rugby player for the Panasonic Wild Knights and the Japan national team.
- Risa Nishioka – professional basketball player for the Mitsubishi Electric Koalas and the Japan national 3x3 team, U23 World Champion.
- Kosuke Shirai – professional soccer player with Shonan Bellmare.
- Paulo Junichi Tanaka – professional soccer player with Kawasaki Frontale and Zweigen Kanazawa.

=== Non-sporting ===
- Yumi Makino – freelance television presenter, formerly contracted to Shizuoka Asahi Television
- Sayuri Matsumura – Member of idol group Nogizaka46.
- Maki Okazoe – television tarento.
- Kei Yamamoto – Member for the Katano City district of the Osaka Prefectural Assembly
