= Yuji Kitagawa =

Japanese rugby union player

- Born: 11 August 1986 (age 40) Osaka, Japan
- Height: 1.96 m (6 ft 5 in)
- School: Osaka Toin Junior and Senior High School

Rugby union career
- Position: Lock
Senior career
Years	Team	Apps	(Points)
- Panasonic Wild Knights
- Correct as of 8 September 2019
International career
Years	Team	Apps	(Points)
2007-2011	Japan	6	(0)
- Correct as of 8 September 2019

Yuji Kitagawa (born 11 August 1986) is a Japanese rugby union player who played as a lock. He represented Japan internationally from 2007 to 2011 and played for the Panasonic Wild Knights in the Japanese Top League. He made his international debut for Japan against Korea on 22 April 2007.

Yuji was included in the Japanese squad for the 2011 Rugby World Cup as an injury replacement to Justin Ives. He made his World Cup debut in the group stage match at the 2011 Rugby World Cup as a substitute against New Zealand on 6 September 2011 which was also his last international match.
