= Norikazu =

- Gender: Male

Origin
- Origin: Japanese
- Meaning: Different meanings depending on the kanji used

Norikazu (written: 仁一, 範一, 範和, 憲和 or 則和) is a masculine Japanese given name. Notable people with the name include:

- Norikazu Fujii (藤井 則和), Japanese table tennis player
- Norikazu Murakami (村上 範和; born 1981), Japanese footballer
- Norikazu Otsuka (大塚 範一; born 1948), Japanese television presenter
- Norikazu Suzuki (鈴木 憲和; born 1982), Japanese politician
- Norikazu Tanabe (田部 仁一; born 1970), Japanese fencer
