= Mika Sugisaki =

Japanese announcer (born 1978)

- 杉崎 美香
- Born: October 31, 1978 (age 47); Ōita, Ōita, Japan
- Education: Yamaguchi University
- Occupations: Announcer, radio personality, entertainer, actress
- Years active: 2001 -
- Agent: Cent Force
- Height: 1.58 m (5 ft 2 in)
- Children: 1
- Website: Official profile

Mika Sugisaki (杉崎 美香, Sugisaki Mika; born October 31, 1978, in Ōita, Ōita, Japan) is a Japanese announcer, radio personality, entertainer, and actress who is represented by the talent agency, Cent Force.

== Biography ==
Sugisaki was born in Ōita, Ōita Prefecture. After graduating from Ōita Prefectural Ōita Tsurusaki High School and Yamaguchi University, she joined as an announcer for Shin-etsu Broadcasting (SBC) on 2001. Sugisaki served for two and a half years until September 2003.

After leaving SBC, she passed the audition for Cent Force. Sugisaki later became the main caster in Fuji Television program Mezanew for eight years until September 30, 2011. She also gained popularity when hosting the GyaO internet program, Mika Sugisaki no Oyasumi Toshokan, and as an MC for NHK's radio programs.

Sugisaki has an ordinary vehicle driver's license and an educational personnel license (English in elementary and junior high school). She introduced in television and books such as Sōchō no Kao and Yaeba no Mezamashi Tenshi.

On the summer of 2008, Sugisaki became the vegetable sommelier of the Junior Vegetable & Fruit Meister.

In January 2015, she married the director of the Fuji TV information program, Mr. Sunday. In May 2016, she gave birth to a healthy baby boy.

== Filmography ==
=== TV series ===
Year	Title	Network	Notes	Ref.
2003	Mezanew	Fuji TV	Main caster	
2004	Mezamashi TV	Fuji TV		
2004	Media Mita Mon Kachi! Zeruma	Fuji TV		
2004	Mezamashi Saturday	Fuji TV		
2006	Mika Sugisaki no Oyasumi Toshokan	GyaO		
2007	Nippon@World	Fuji TV	Navigator	
2010	Warai ga Ichiban	NHK	Moderator	
2011	Foot×Brain	TV Tokyo	Main caster	
2011	Asian Ace	TBS	Moderator	
2012	Keiba Beat	KTV	Main caster	
2012	Sekai Naze Soko ni? Nihonjin: Shira Rezaru Haranbanjō-den	TV Tokyo		
2012	Doyō no Yoru wa! Otonana TV	TVQ	Moderator	

=== Radio series ===
Year	Title	Network	Notes
1998	Kinyōbi wa Flyday	FM-Yamaguchi	
2004	Fumio Takada no Radio Beverly Hills	NBS	
2004	Masaharu Fukuyama no All Night Nippon Saturday Special Tamashī no Radio	NBS	
2006	Tomoaki Ogura no Radio Circuit	NBS	Assistant
2007	All Night Nippon	NBS	
2007	J-Wave Christmas Special Sapporo Draft One Presents Tree Top Party 07	J-Wave	
2008	Au Download Music Chart	FM Tokyo, JFN	
2013	Face	JFN	Tuesday

=== Other ===
Year	Title	Notes
2010	Lismo Channel	Wednesday MC

=== SBC era ===
Sugisaki was mainly in charge in television and radio news, weather forecast, reporter, etc.

TV series

Title	Notes
2002 Fresh All-Star Game	Reporter
U Parade	Reporter
Ohayō Chat	
SBC Special	

Radio series

Title	Notes
Tokoton Kinyōbi	
Radio Donburi	
Morning Wide Radio J	
Oishī Wide Maru-sa ka Chin	

=== Advertisements ===
Year	Title	Notes
	SBC Royal Car Station	
	Recycle Shop Tentekomai	Narration
2010	Pola "Whitey Simo"	
2010	Kentucky Fried Chicken "Yuzukara Chicken"	
2011	Kai "Kai Razor"	
2013	Meiji "Meiji no Takuhai"	

=== Music ===
Title	Notes
Neicha Sisters "Genkida! Dance"	
Dreams Come True "A-i-shi-te-ru no Sain: Watashi-tachi no Mirai Yosō-zu"	Also starred in the music video as OL

=== Anime ===
Title	Role	Notes
Doki Doki School Hours	News announcer	

=== Stage shows ===
Year	Title	Notes	Ref.
2008	Seasons	Narrator	

=== Books ===
Year	Title	Notes
2008	Mikan Noji Kan Mika Sugisaki 1114days. ISBN 978-4594057107.	Fusosha

Photo albums

Year	Title	Notes
2005	Kimi ni Todokimasu yō ni. ISBN 978-4847028922.	Wani Books
