= Yoshiyuki Fuchiwaki =

Japanese baseball player

- Infielder
- Born: 渕脇 芳行; May 23, 1974 (age 51); Neyagawa, Osaka Prefecture, Japan
- Batted: Right Threw: Right

NPB debut
- April 13, 1999, for the Osaka Kintetsu Buffaloes

Last NPB appearance
- April 13, 1999, for the Osaka Kintetsu Buffaloes

Teams
- Osaka Kintetsu Buffaloes (1993–1999)

Yoshiyuki Fuchiwaki (渕脇 芳行) is a Japanese retired professional baseball player. He spent seven seasons with the Osaka Kintetsu Buffaloes and made one appearance in a first-team match.

== Career ==
=== High school ===
Fuchiwaki was a member of the Osaka Tōin High School baseball club. While in his final year of high school he was drafted by the Kintetsu Buffaloes in the 6th round of the 1992 draft.

=== Professional career ===
Fuchiwaki spent 7 seasons with the Kintetsu Buffaloes from 1992 to 1999 (the Buffaloes became the Osaka Kintetsu Buffaloes before the start of the 1999 season). On April 13, 1999 he made his only appearance for the Buffaloes' first team, entering the game as a pinch runner in the top half of the 8th inning. He had two at bats later in the match, but failed to reach first base.

Fuchiwaki played 19 games for the Fujiidera Buffaloes (Kintetsu's farm team) in 1999, down from 72 the previous year. He retired from professional baseball at the end of the 1999 season.

In 2012 Fuchiwaki became the coach of Riseisha High School's baseball club.
