= Hida, Gifu =

Hida Furukawa 飛騨市
- City
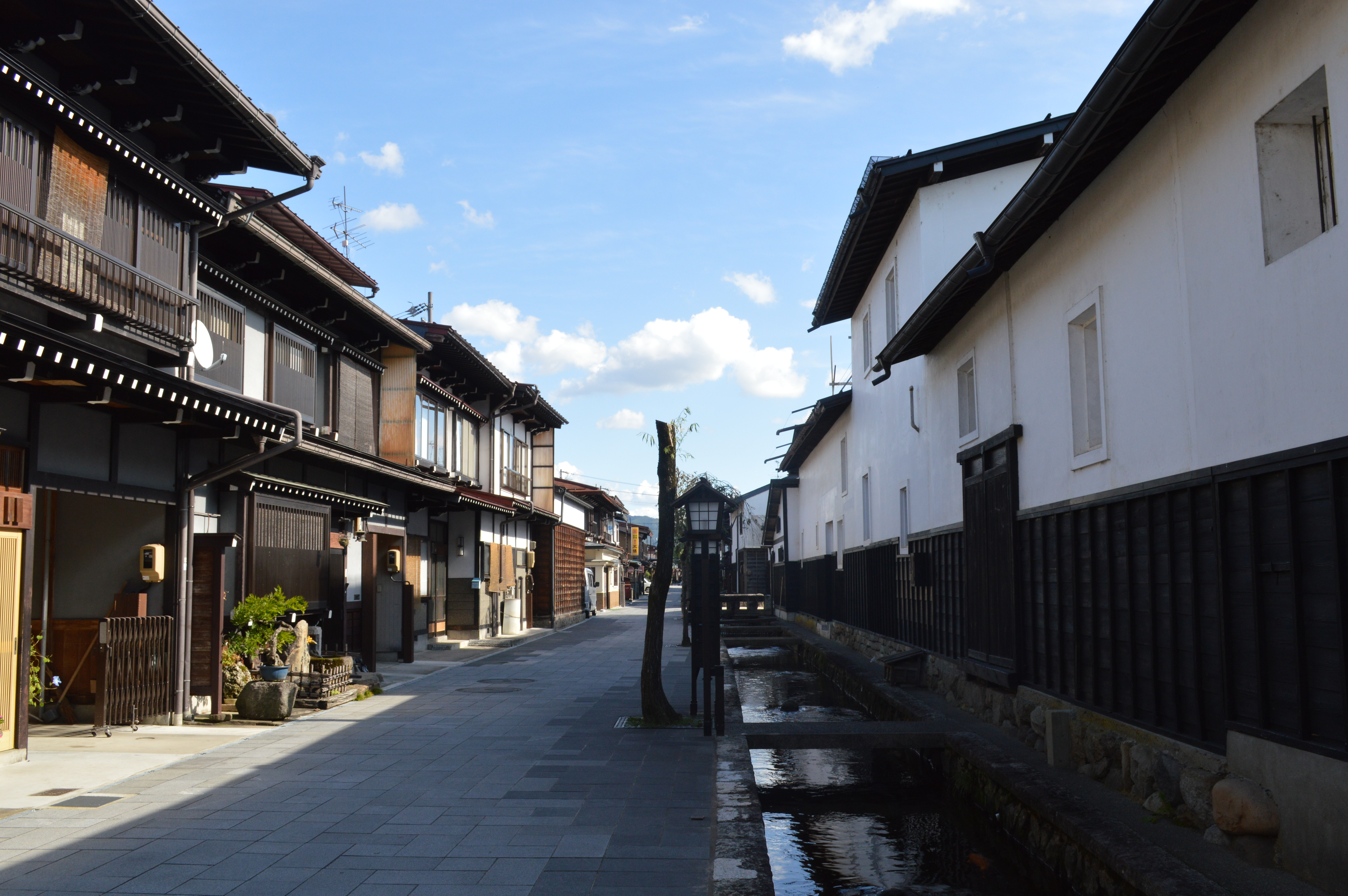
- View of Hida old town

- Flag Seal

- Location of Hida in Gifu Prefecture

- Coordinates: 36°14′17.3″N 137°11′10.4″E
- Country: Japan
- Region: Chūbu
- Prefecture: Gifu

Area
  - Total: 792.53 km^{2} (306.00 sq mi)

Population (November 1, 2017)
  - Total: 24,726
  - Density: 31.199/km^{2} (80.805/sq mi)
- Time zone: UTC+9 (Japan Standard Time)
- Phone number: 0577-73-2111
- Address: 2-22 Hon-machi, Furukawa-chō, Hida-shi, Gifu-ken 509-4292
- Climate: Dfa
- Website: Official website
- Symbols
- Flower: Lysichiton camtschatcense
- Tree: Beech

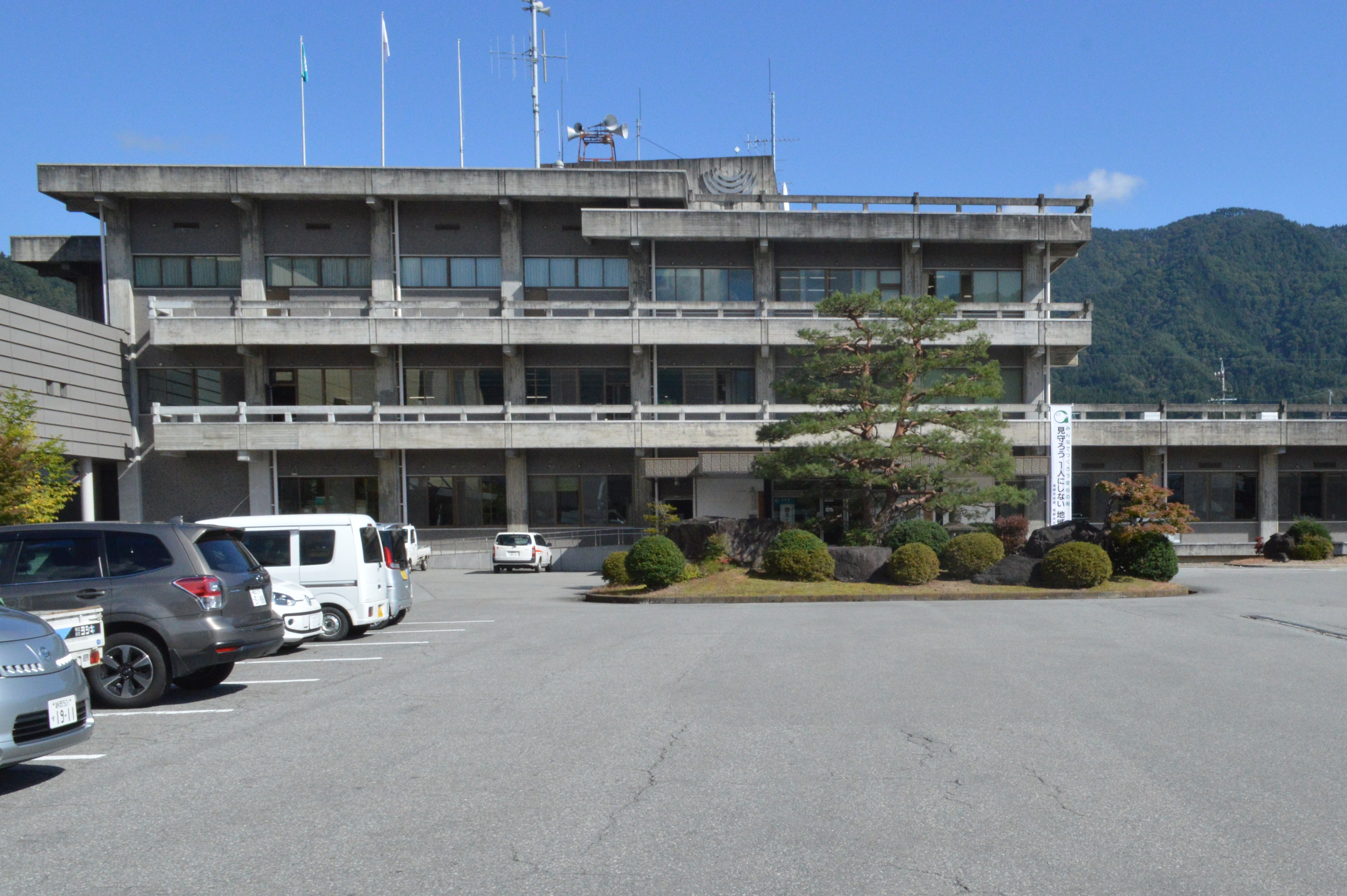
Hida City Hall

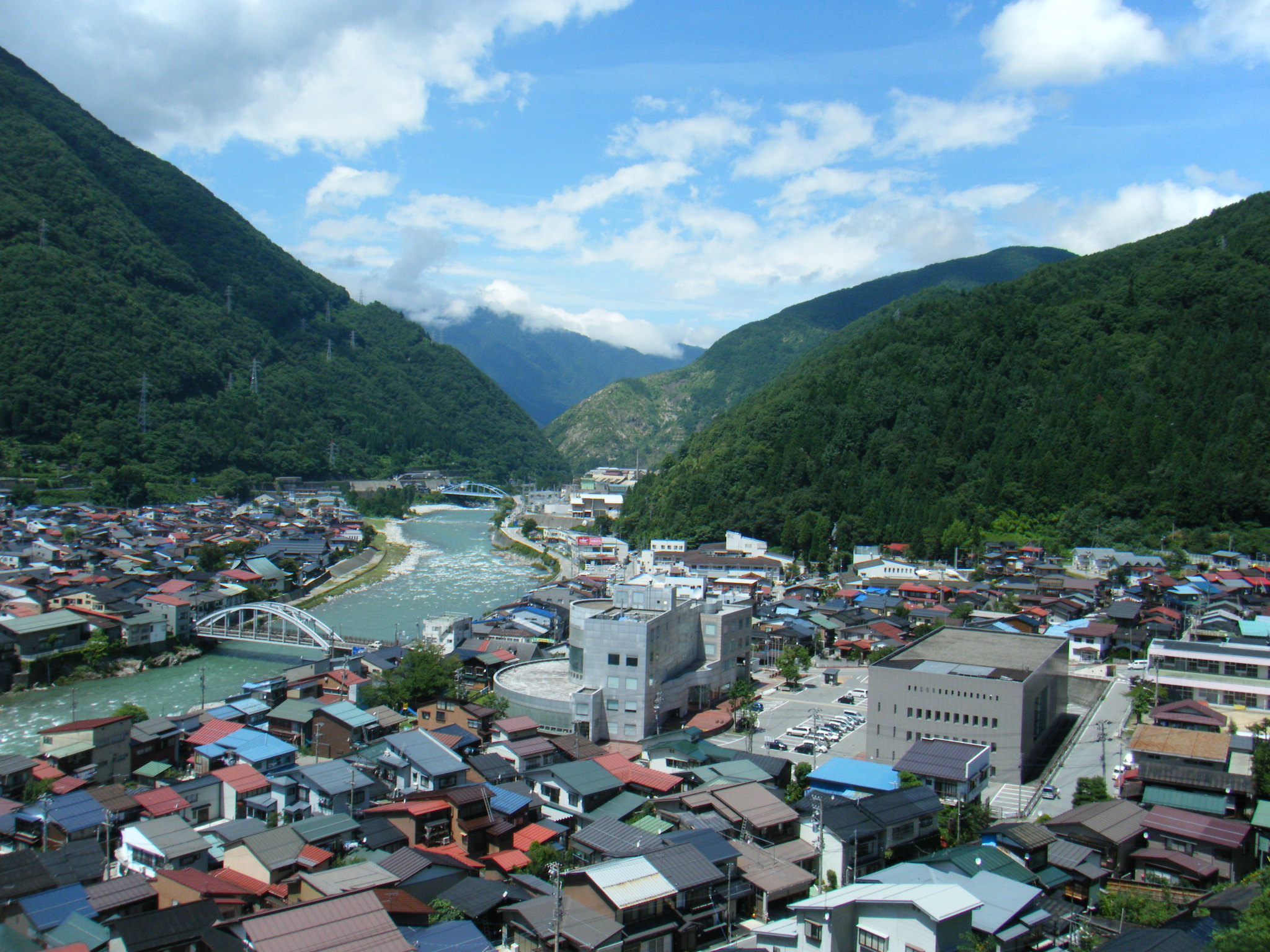
Kamioka district in Hida

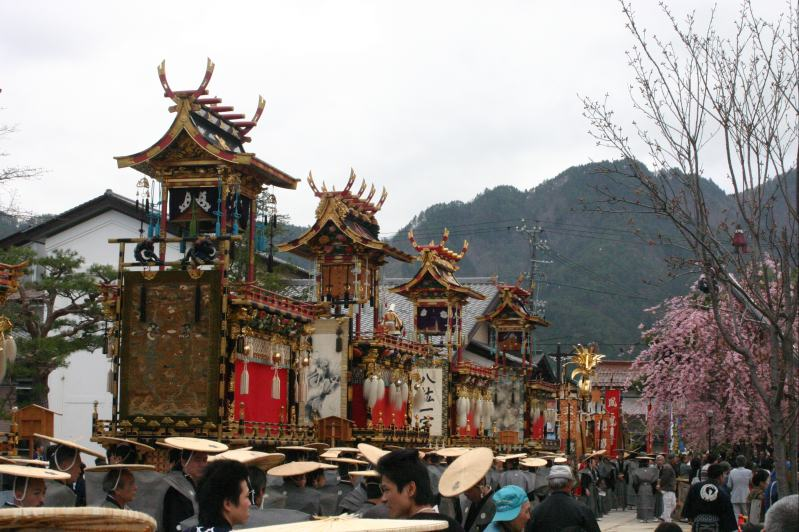
Furukawa Festival, held annually in April

Hida (飛騨市, Hida-shi; Japanese pronunciation: [çí.dä̀, çì.dä́.ɕì]) is a city located in Gifu, Japan. As of 1 December 2017, the city had an estimated population of 24,726, and a population density of 31 persons per km^{2}, in 8,905 households. The total area of the city was 792.53 square kilometres (306.00 sq mi). The official kanji for the city is actually 飛驒, which uses the old rendering of the 騨 character. However, the 驒 character is not included on the official list of usable characters (as decided by the Ministry of Internal Affairs and Communications), so the 騨 character is often used outside of the city.

== Geography ==
Hida is the northernmost city in Gifu Prefecture, and is located in the northern part of the Hida Highlands bordering on Toyama Prefecture to the north. The majority of the area of the city is forested, with many mountains exceeding 1,000 meters within the city borders. The northeastern edge of the Hida Mountain range exceeds 2,000 meters. Most of the population is concentrated along river terraces along the Jinzū River and the Takahara River.

=== Neighbouring municipalities ===
- Gifu Prefecture
  - Shirakawa
  - Takayama
- Toyama Prefecture
  - Nanto
  - Toyama

== Climate ==
The city has a climate characterized by hot and humid summers, and mild winters (Köppen climate classification Dfa). The average annual temperature in Hida is 10.6 °C (51.1 °F). The average annual rainfall is 2,049.7 mm (80.70 in) with July as the wettest month. The temperatures are highest on average in August, at around 23.5 °C (74.3 °F), and lowest in January, at around −1.5 °C (29.3 °F).

Climate data for Kamioka, Hida (1991–2020 normals, extremes 1978–present)
Month	Jan	Feb	Mar	Apr	May	Jun	Jul	Aug	Sep	Oct	Nov	Dec	Year
Record high °C (°F)	17.8 (64.0)	20.5 (68.9)	26.6 (79.9)	31.8 (89.2)	35.0 (95.0)	35.1 (95.2)	36.9 (98.4)	37.8 (100.0)	37.1 (98.8)	31.1 (88.0)	27.3 (81.1)	20.4 (68.7)	37.8 (100.0)
Mean daily maximum °C (°F)	3.4 (38.1)	4.5 (40.1)	9.6 (49.3)	17.1 (62.8)	22.6 (72.7)	25.6 (78.1)	28.9 (84.0)	30.5 (86.9)	25.7 (78.3)	19.8 (67.6)	13.6 (56.5)	6.7 (44.1)	17.4 (63.3)
Daily mean °C (°F)	−0.8 (30.6)	−0.4 (31.3)	3.3 (37.9)	9.6 (49.3)	15.3 (59.5)	19.4 (66.9)	23.1 (73.6)	24.2 (75.6)	19.9 (67.8)	13.5 (56.3)	7.4 (45.3)	2.0 (35.6)	11.4 (52.5)
Mean daily minimum °C (°F)	−4.3 (24.3)	−4.6 (23.7)	−1.5 (29.3)	3.4 (38.1)	9.1 (48.4)	14.5 (58.1)	19.0 (66.2)	19.8 (67.6)	15.7 (60.3)	9.1 (48.4)	2.9 (37.2)	−1.5 (29.3)	6.8 (44.2)
Record low °C (°F)	−14.5 (5.9)	−16.7 (1.9)	−11.7 (10.9)	−6.2 (20.8)	−1.1 (30.0)	4.7 (40.5)	11.0 (51.8)	11.8 (53.2)	4.6 (40.3)	−1.8 (28.8)	−5.8 (21.6)	−13.6 (7.5)	−16.7 (1.9)
Average precipitation mm (inches)	155.2 (6.11)	122.8 (4.83)	136.1 (5.36)	129.1 (5.08)	133.4 (5.25)	172.0 (6.77)	267.2 (10.52)	191.1 (7.52)	209.7 (8.26)	152.0 (5.98)	123.0 (4.84)	158.6 (6.24)	1,937.5 (76.28)
Average snowfall cm (inches)	217 (85)	172 (68)	94 (37)	6 (2.4)	0 (0)	0 (0)	0 (0)	0 (0)	0 (0)	0 (0)	5 (2.0)	123 (48)	611 (241)
Average precipitation days (≥ 1.0 mm)	19.9	15.4	15.5	12.0	12.0	12.4	15.3	11.2	12.4	11.7	14.1	18.5	170.7
Mean monthly sunshine hours	78.3	105.0	144.3	177.0	205.7	165.2	162.0	196.9	144.6	143.8	116.3	79.9	1,714.7
Source: Japan Meteorological Agency (1991–2020 normals, extremes 1978–present)

Climate data for Kawai, Hida (1991–2020 normals, extremes 1978–present)
Month	Jan	Feb	Mar	Apr	May	Jun	Jul	Aug	Sep	Oct	Nov	Dec	Year
Record high °C (°F)	13.3 (55.9)	15.6 (60.1)	24.5 (76.1)	29.8 (85.6)	32.4 (90.3)	34.8 (94.6)	35.5 (95.9)	36.4 (97.5)	35.2 (95.4)	29.0 (84.2)	24.3 (75.7)	17.0 (62.6)	36.4 (97.5)
Mean daily maximum °C (°F)	1.9 (35.4)	3.2 (37.8)	7.9 (46.2)	15.7 (60.3)	21.8 (71.2)	24.8 (76.6)	28.1 (82.6)	29.5 (85.1)	25.0 (77.0)	19.0 (66.2)	12.1 (53.8)	4.8 (40.6)	16.2 (61.2)
Daily mean °C (°F)	−1.5 (29.3)	−1.2 (29.8)	2.0 (35.6)	8.3 (46.9)	14.6 (58.3)	18.8 (65.8)	22.6 (72.7)	23.5 (74.3)	19.3 (66.7)	12.9 (55.2)	6.6 (43.9)	1.1 (34.0)	10.6 (51.1)
Mean daily minimum °C (°F)	−4.6 (23.7)	−5.0 (23.0)	−2.3 (27.9)	2.5 (36.5)	8.4 (47.1)	14.1 (57.4)	18.8 (65.8)	19.4 (66.9)	15.3 (59.5)	8.8 (47.8)	2.7 (36.9)	−1.7 (28.9)	6.4 (43.5)
Record low °C (°F)	−15.8 (3.6)	−14.9 (5.2)	−12.6 (9.3)	−7.3 (18.9)	−0.9 (30.4)	3.8 (38.8)	11.0 (51.8)	10.6 (51.1)	4.2 (39.6)	−1.2 (29.8)	−7.5 (18.5)	−14.3 (6.3)	−15.8 (3.6)
Average precipitation mm (inches)	199.2 (7.84)	149.8 (5.90)	148.6 (5.85)	124.1 (4.89)	124.4 (4.90)	166.8 (6.57)	272.0 (10.71)	172.8 (6.80)	206.0 (8.11)	154.6 (6.09)	133.8 (5.27)	197.7 (7.78)	2,049.7 (80.70)
Average snowfall cm (inches)	289 (114)	223 (88)	126 (50)	15 (5.9)	0 (0)	0 (0)	0 (0)	0 (0)	0 (0)	0 (0)	9 (3.5)	169 (67)	799 (315)
Average precipitation days (≥ 1.0 mm)	21.6	16.8	16.0	12.5	11.6	11.6	14.9	11.7	12.5	11.6	14.4	19.8	175.1
Mean monthly sunshine hours	48.3	73.3	124.2	174.6	201.1	153.2	151.3	173.0	124.9	118.8	87.6	51.5	1,481.7
Source: Japan Meteorological Agency (1991–2020 normals, extremes 1978–present)

== Demographics ==
Per Japanese census data, the population of Hida has decreased steadily over the past 50 years.

Historical population
Year	Pop.	±%
1970	40,965	—
1980	36,100	−11.9%
1990	32,690	−9.4%
2000	30,421	−6.9%
2010	26,732	−12.1%
2020	22,538	−15.7%

== History ==
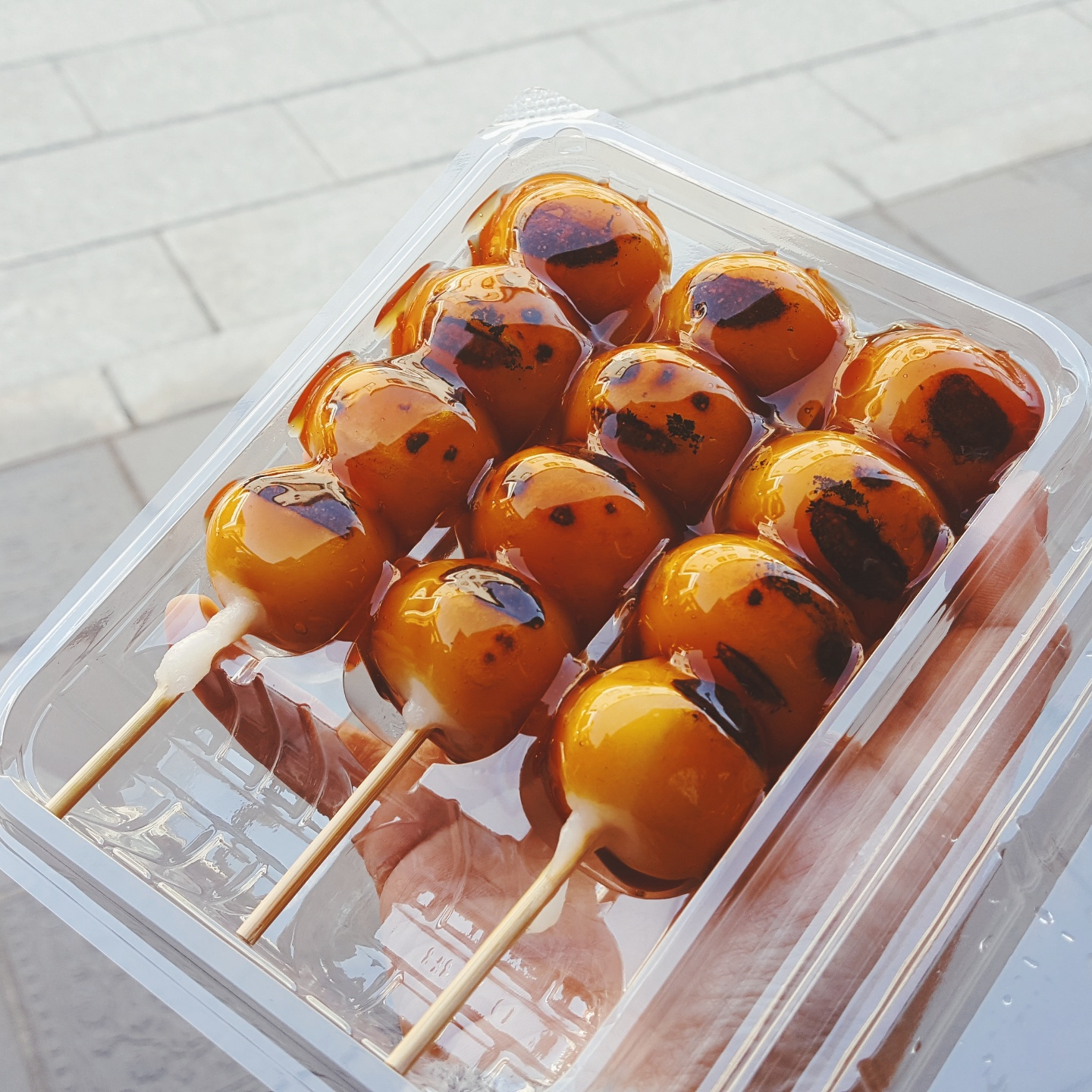
Together with Hida Takayama, Hida Furukawa is known for its mitarashi dango, normally a sweet rice dumpling in a skew but in these areas due to the harsh temperatures there is a salty variation because of the soy sauce instead of sugar

The area around Hida Furukawa was part of traditional Hida Province. During the Edo period, the whole Hida province was tenryō territory under the direct control of the Tokugawa shogunate. During the post-Meiji restoration whole Japan was under a massive westernization and new reforms, the area was organised into Yoshiki District, Gifu. On July 1, 1889, with the establishment of the modern municipalities system, the town of Furukawa and the villages of Kawai and Miyagawa were created. The modern city of Hida Furukawa was established on February 1, 2004, from the merger of these municipalities with the town of Kamioka. In this region there is always a disambiguation between Hida Furukawa and Hida Takayama or Takayama city. Even though Furukawa has is own municipality, Takayama is a mayor city in the area after Gifu city, and Furukawa is under Hida Takayama's precincts.

== Government ==
Hida Furukawa has a mayor-council form of government with a directly elected mayor and a unicameral city legislature of 14 members

== Economy ==
The main two traditional economies in the city are the production of sake and traditional Japanese candles. The Furukawa area of the city is known for both of these crafts, while the Kamioka section is mainly known for its sake production.

== Education ==
Hida has five public elementary schools, two public middle schools and one combined elementary/middle school operated by the city government. The city has two public high schools operated by the Gifu Prefectural Board of Education. Tokyo University's Super-Kamiokande neutrino observatory together with the data processing centre (Kamioka Observatory) has been located in Kamioka since 2002.

== Transportation ==
=== Railway ===
JR Tōkai – Takayama Main Line

- Hida-Furukawa – Sugisaki – Hida-Hosoe – Tsunogawa – Sakakami – Utsubo – Sugihara

=== Local bus ===
From Takayama [Nohi bus]

=== Highway ===
- E41 Tōkai-Hokuriku Expressway, which connects the cities of Nagoya and Gifu with Toyama.
- National Route 41
- National Route 360
- National Route 471
- National Route 472

== Sister cities ==
- Leutasch, Austria, friendship city since January 23, 1998
- Libin, Belgium, sister city since September 9, 1996
- Xingang, Chiayi, Taiwan, sister city since October 13, 2017

== Local attractions ==
=== Festivals in Hida ===
The Furukawa Festival is held annually on April 19 and 20. This traditional event is an annual festival of the Keta Wakamiya Shrine. It attracts many tourists every year, especially on the night of the 19th when the large drum float, Okoshi-Daiko, is paraded through the town by hundreds of half-naked men.

== Popular culture ==
=== Your Name ===
Hida Furukawa was featured in several key locations in the popular 2016 animated film, Your Name.
