= Makuhari Junior and Senior High School =

Private secondary school in Chiba, Japan

Coordinates: 35°39′16″N 140°02′44″E

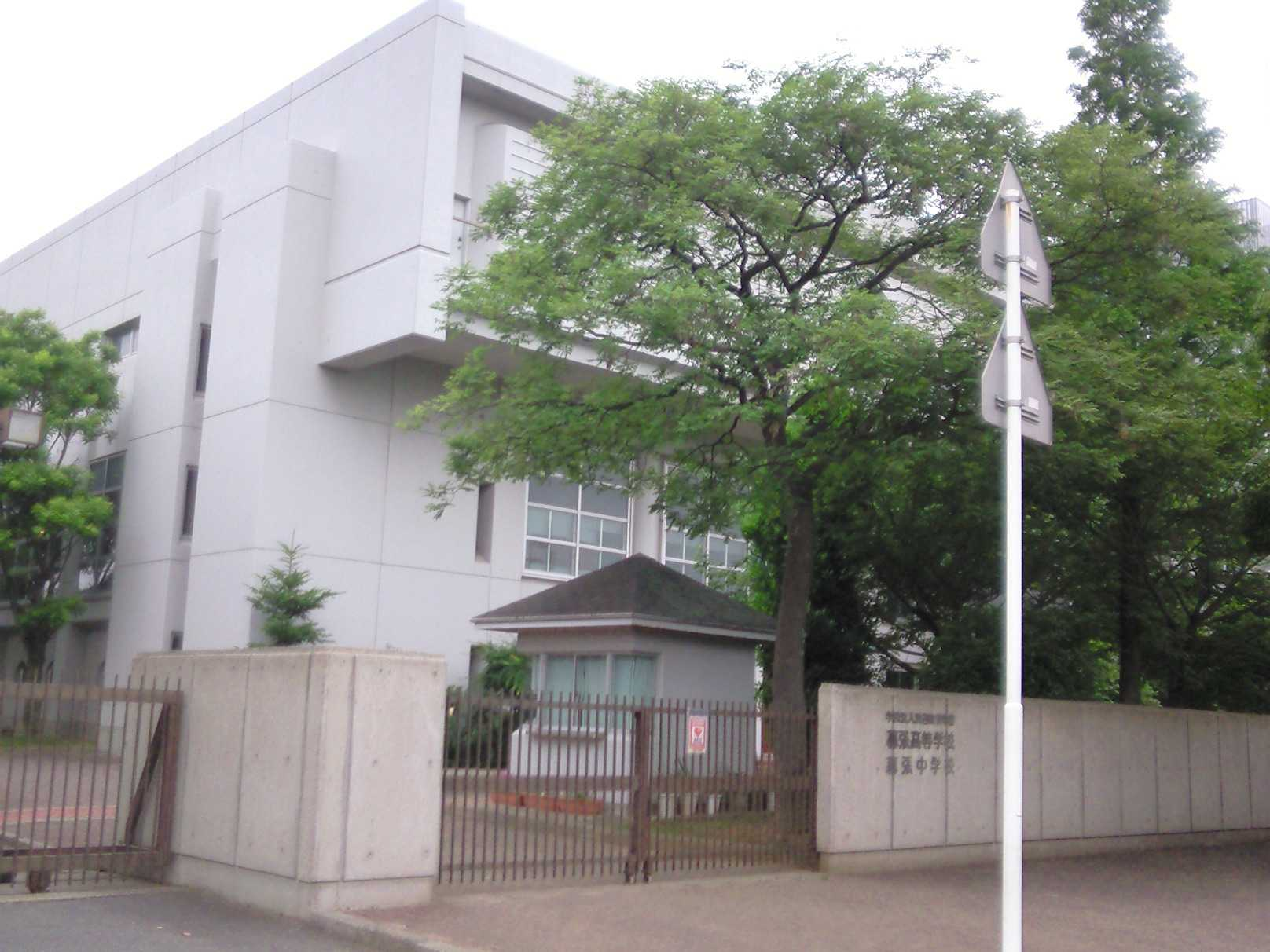
The front entrance to Makuhari Junior and Senior High School

Makuhari Junior and Senior High School (渋谷教育学園幕張中学校・高等学校, Shibuya Kyōiku Gakuen Makuhari Chūgakkō Kōtōgakkō) is a Japanese private secondary school in the Makuhari area, in Mihama-ku, Chiba City, Chiba Prefecture. It is operated by the Shibuya Kyouiku Gakuen (渋谷教育学園, Shibuya Kyōiku Gakuen). The school shares its educational philosophy with its sister school, Shibuya Junior and Senior High School.

== History ==
Tetsuo Tamura (田村 哲夫 Tamura Tetsuo) established the school to serve Japanese students who have lived abroad, returned to Japan, and have had difficulties adjusting to the Japanese educational system. Tamura stated that some of the people who he considered to be the most outstanding had received their early education while outside Japan, so he became interested in the education of Japanese people who were returning to Japan after being stationed overseas.

The school opened in 1983 as Makuhari Senior High School. The junior high school opened in 1986.

== Student Population ==
Currently, there are 9 classes in Junior High School 1st Grade and 2nd Grade. The number of classes is reduced to 8 classes in 3rd Grade. From High School, an additional one class of high school transfer students join.

== Notable University Acceptance Data ==
Since its inception in 1983, the rise in the number of accepted students to Japan's most prestigious university, Tokyo University has led to it being called "渋幕の奇跡” or, 'the miracle of Shibumaku' among educators.

== Notable alumni ==
=== Entertainers ===
- Kazutoshi Satō
- Kei Tanaka
- Kumi of Love Psychedelico
- Aiko Kaitou
- Thomas Lauderdale (Exchange student)

=== Athletes ===
==== American football players ====
- Kansei Matsuzawa

==== Figure skaters ====
- Rena Inoue
- Narumi Takahashi

==== Soccer players ====
- Marcus Tulio Tanaka
- Kota Hattori
- Sandro
- Josue Souza Santos

==== Tennis Players ====
- Kyōko Nagatsuka
- Takahiro Terachi
- Erika Takao

=== Artists ===
- Yui Haga

== Notable staff ==
- Yuta Imazeki

== See also ==
- List of junior high schools in Chiba Prefecture
- Waseda Shibuya Senior High School in Singapore (formerly Shibuya Makuhari Singapore School)
