= Hiromi Kawata =

Japanese free announcer (born 1983)

- 川田 裕美
- Born: June 22, 1983 (age 43); Izumiōtsu, Osaka Prefecture, Japan
- Other name: Kawa-chan (かわちゃん)
- Education: Osaka Prefectural Mikunigaoka High School; Wakayama University Faculty of Economics
- Occupation: Announcer
- Years active: 2006–
- Agent: Cent Force
- Known for: Orico Presents Field of Dreams; Sumomo mo momo mo! Peach Cafe; Mune-ippai Summit!; 1-shūkaitte Shiranai Hanashi; Nippon Tabi × Tabi Show; Asanama Wide: Ce Matin; Jōhō Live: Miyaneya; Mayo Bradio
- Height: 1.58 m (5 ft 2 in)
- Children: 2
- Website: Official profile

Hiromi Kawata (川田 裕美, Kawata Hiromi; born 22 June 1983, in Izumiōtsu, Osaka Prefecture, Japan) is a Japanese free announcer. She is represented by Cent Force.

== Filmography ==
=== Current appearances ===
TV series

| Year | Title | Network | Notes | Ref. |
|---|---|---|---|---|
| 2015 | Sumomo mo momo mo! Peach Cafe | YTV | Main MC | |
| 2016 | Mune-ippai Summit! | KTV | | |
| 2016 | 1-shūkaitte Shiranai Hanashi | NTV | Assistant | |
| 2016 | Kagayaki Yell! | NTV | Narration | |

Radio

| Year | Title | Network | Notes | Ref. |
|---|---|---|---|---|
| 2015 | Orico Presents Field of Dreams | Tokyo FM | Personality | |
| 2016 | Love in Action | FM Osaka | | |

Advertisements

| Year | Title | Notes |
|---|---|---|
| 2016 | The Kiyo Bank | Image character |

=== Former appearances ===
As a YTV announcer

| Year | Title | Notes |
|---|---|---|
| 2008 | NaruTomo! | |
| 2010 | Ukiki no Oshiete Sensei! | |
| 2010 | Tsunagari Fantasy: Itsumo! Garigeru | |
| 2011 | CunE! | |
| 2011 | Osaka Honwaka TV | "Jōhō Kissaten Corner" |
| 2011 | YTV Announcer Kojo Iinkai Gyūn | Irregular appearances |
| 2011 | Zoom In!! Super | Monday, Thursday, Friday appearances |
| 2011 | Osaka Marathon 2011 | Special studio appearance |
| 2011 | Asanama Wide: Ce Matin | |
| 2011 | Jōhō Live: Miyaneya | |
| 2015 | Kuse ni naru yayakoshi-sa: Black Mayonaise no Hatena no Canzume | |
| 2015 | NNN Straight News | Irregular local appearances |
| 2015 | 24 Hour Television | Local presenter |

TV dramas

| Year | Title | Role | Network | Notes |
|---|---|---|---|---|
| 2012 | Case Closed | | YTV | |
| 2014 | Is There a Vet in the House? | Magazine reporter | YTV | Episode 3 |
| 2016 | Toto Neechan | | NHK | Episode 115, Asadora |
| 2019 | No Side Manager | Shiori | TBS | |

Films

| Year | Title | Role |
|---|---|---|
| 2012 | Ace Attorney | Newspaper sales clerk |
