= Shinji Imanaka =

Japanese baseball player

- Pitcher
- Born: March 6, 1971 (age 54); Kadoma, Osaka, Japan
- Batted: Left Threw: Left

NPB debut
- May 26, 1989, for the Chunichi Dragons

Last NPB appearance
- July 13, 2001, for the Chunichi Dragons

NPB statistics (through 2001)
- Win–loss record: 91-69
- Saves: 5
- ERA: 3.15
- Strikeouts: 1129

Teams
- As player: Chunichi Dragons (1989–2001); As coach: Chunichi Dragons (2012–2013)

Career highlights and awards
- 1x Eiji Sawamura Award (1993); 1x Central League Win Champion (1993); 1x Central League Strikeout Champion (1993); 1x Central League MVP for Pitcher (1993); 1× Best Nine Award (1993); 1× Mitsui Golden Glove Award (1993); 4x NPB All-Star (1991, 1993–1995)
- Last updated on: 9 February 2014

Shinji Imanaka (今中 慎二, Imanaka Shinji; born March 6, 1971 in Kadoma, Osaka, Japan) is a former Nippon Professional Baseball pitcher.

Imanaka attended the Daitō campus of Osaka Sangyo University High School, which became Osaka Tōin High School in his final year. He was recognized as the school's ace pitcher and scouted by several clubs, including the Yomiuri Giants and his hometown team, the Hanshin Tigers. Despite being a Hanshin fan himself, Imanaka had his sights set solely on playing for the Chunichi Dragons, who had won the league pennant during his final year of high school. Imanaka went as far as declaring that he would not play professional baseball if another team drafted him. Chunichi obliged and selected him in the first round of the 1988 rookie draft.
