= Ryōsuke Hirata =

Japanese baseball player (born 1988)

Ryōsuke Hirata 平田 良介
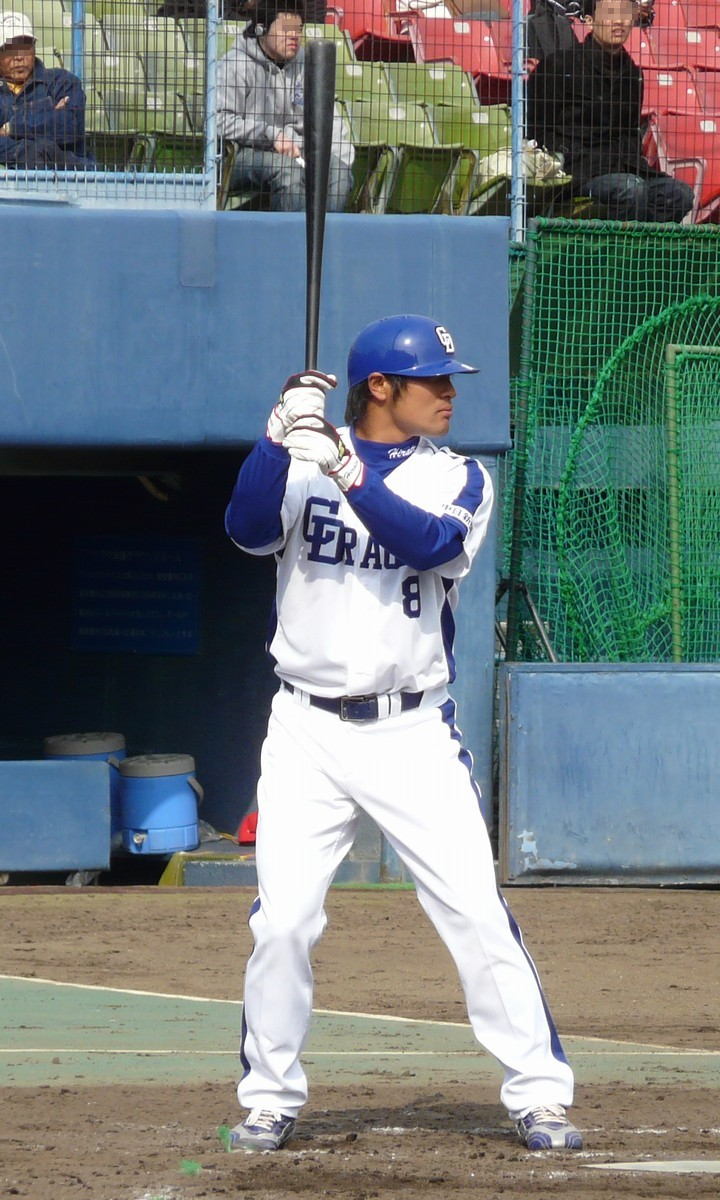
- Hirata with the Chunichi Dragons

Chunichi Dragons – No. 79
- Outfielder/Coach
- Born: March 23, 1988 (age 37); Jōtō-ku, Osaka, Japan
- Batted: Right Threw: Right

NPB debut
- August 26, 2006, for the Chunichi Dragons

Last NPB appearance
- September 17, 2022, for the Chunichi Dragons

NPB statistics
- Batting average: .268
- Home runs: 105
- RBI: 484

Teams
- As player: Chunichi Dragons (2006–2022); As coach: Chunichi Dragons (2025–present)

Career highlights and awards
- NPB All-Star (2018); Central League Golden Glove Award (2018); Central League Best Nine Award (2015); Central League Monthly MVP (June 2011)
Medals
Men's baseball
Representing Japan
2015 WBSC Premier12
Bronze medal – third place	2015 Tokyo	Team
World Baseball Classic
Bronze medal – third place	2017 Los Angeles	Team

Ryōsuke Hirata (平田 良介, Hirata Ryōsuke; born March 23, 1988 in Jōtō-ku, Osaka, Japan) is a Japanese professional baseball outfielder. He last played for the Chunichi Dragons in Japan's Nippon Professional Baseball. He played for the Dragons over a 16-year period.

He is currently an outfield defense and baserunning coach for the Dragons.

== Career ==
Hirata attended Osaka Tōin High School and was a member of the team that advanced to the semi-finals of the 2005 national championships. and tied Kazuhiro Kiyohara's record of 5 home runs at the tournament. He hit a total of 70 home runs during his three years of high school. He was drafted by the Dragons in the first round of the 2005 rookie draft.

In 2015, Hirata was made team captain of the Dragons marking the first time the Dragons had an appointed captain since Tōru Nimura in 1994.

In 2018, Hirata was selected for the 2018 NPB All-Star game.
