= Mitsuyo Kusano =

- Born: 4 February 1967 (age 59); Fukuoka, Japan (currently Nakatsugawa City)
- Education: Tsuda Juku University
- Occupations: journalist; news anchor; television presenter
- Years active: 1989–present
- Spouse: none
- Children: none

Mitsuyo Kusano (草野満代, Kusano Mitsuyo; born 4 February 1967 in Nakatsugawa, Gifu) is a female Japanese TV presenter and news anchor. She once served as an announcer for NHK and as one of the masters of ceremony for the annual Kohaku Uta Gassen.
