= Norikazu Otsuka =

Japanese TV presenter (born 1948)

Norikazu Otsuka(S-28)
- 大塚 範一
- Born: 28 September 1948 (age 77); Tokyo, Japan
- Education: Waseda University
- Occupation: TV presenter
- Years active: 1973 – 2013
- Employer: Fuji TV
- Television: Mezamashi TV

Norikazu Otsuka (大塚 範一, Ōtsuka Norikazu; born 28 September 1948) is a Japanese TV presenter. He was the main presenter of Fuji TV's morning TV magazine show Mezamashi TV from its start in 1994 until he left the show in November 2011 due to illness.

== Early life and education ==
Otsuka was born in Tokyo on 28 September 1948.

In 1973, he graduated from Waseda University, Department of Political Science and Economics.

== Career ==
Immediately after graduating from university in 1973, Otsuka started work at NHK, working at various regional offices, including Takamatsu, Hiroshima, and Nagoya, over a period of eleven years before being transferred to Tokyo. There, he presented TV programmes such as Sunday Sports Special (サンデースポーツスペシャル) and Quiz 100 points Full Marks (クイズ百点満点), as well as working as a commentator for baseball, football, and tennis broadcasts.

He left NHK in March 1994, and began presenting Fuji TV's Mezamashi TV morning show from April 1994.

Otsuka took a break from presenting Mezamashi TV in November 2011 to undergo treatment for acute lymphoblastic leukemia. In February 2012, it was announced that Otsuka would be formally leaving the programme as of April 2012. He was released from hospital in October 2012, and made a live appearance on Mezamashii TV on 4 February 2013, after 15 months away from the screen. During this appearance, Otsuka revealed that he would be returning to work at Fuji TV, presenting a new afternoon magazine show, Ageru TV (アゲるテレビ), from April 2013. However, in March of the same year, it was revealed that Otsuka's leukemia had relapsed, and that he would not be presenting the show. The show was terminated at the end of September 2013, after just six months on the air.
