= Sugisaki Station =

Railway station in Hida, Gifu Prefecture, Japan

Sugisaki Station 杉崎駅
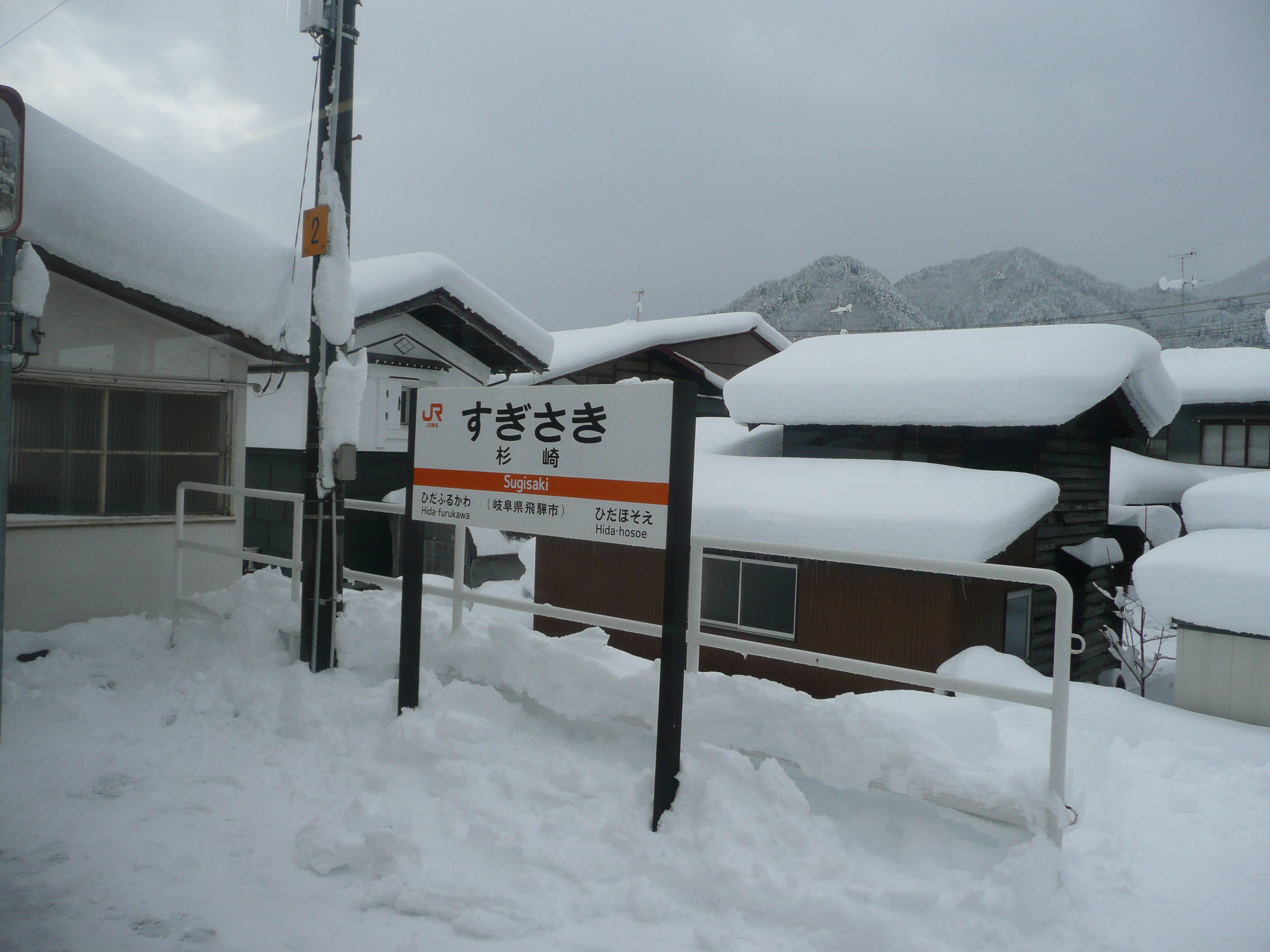
- Sugisaki Station in March 2009

General information
- Location: Furukawa-cho Numa-cho, Hida-shi, Gifu-ken 509-4214; Japan
- Coordinates: 36.2502°N 137.1691°E
- Operator: JR Central
- Line: Takayama Main Line
- Distance: 153.6 km from Gifu
- Platforms: 1 side platform
- Tracks: 1

Other information
- Status: Unstaffed

History
- Opened: December 25, 1952
Location
- Location within Gifu Prefecture Location within Japan

Sugisaki Station (杉崎駅, Sugisaki-eki) is a railway station on the Takayama Main Line in the city of Hida, Gifu Prefecture, Japan, operated by Central Japan Railway Company (JR Central).

== Lines ==
Sugisaki Station is served by the Takayama Main Line, and is located 153.6 kilometers from the official starting point of the line at Gifu.

== Station layout ==
Sugisaki Station has one ground-level side platform serving a single bi-directional track. The station is unattended.

== Adjacent stations ==
«	Service	»
Takayama Main Line
Limited Express "Hida": Does not stop at this station
Hida-Furukawa	Local	Hida-Hosoe

== History ==
Sugisaki Station opened on December 25, 1952. The station was absorbed into the JR Central network upon the privatization of the Japanese National Railways (JNR) on April 1, 1987.

== Surrounding area ==
The station is located in a rural area with a few houses nearby.

== See also ==
- List of railway stations in Japan
