= Yūmi Nagashima =

Japanese announcer for Fuji TV (born 1991)

Yūmi Nagashima 永島 優美
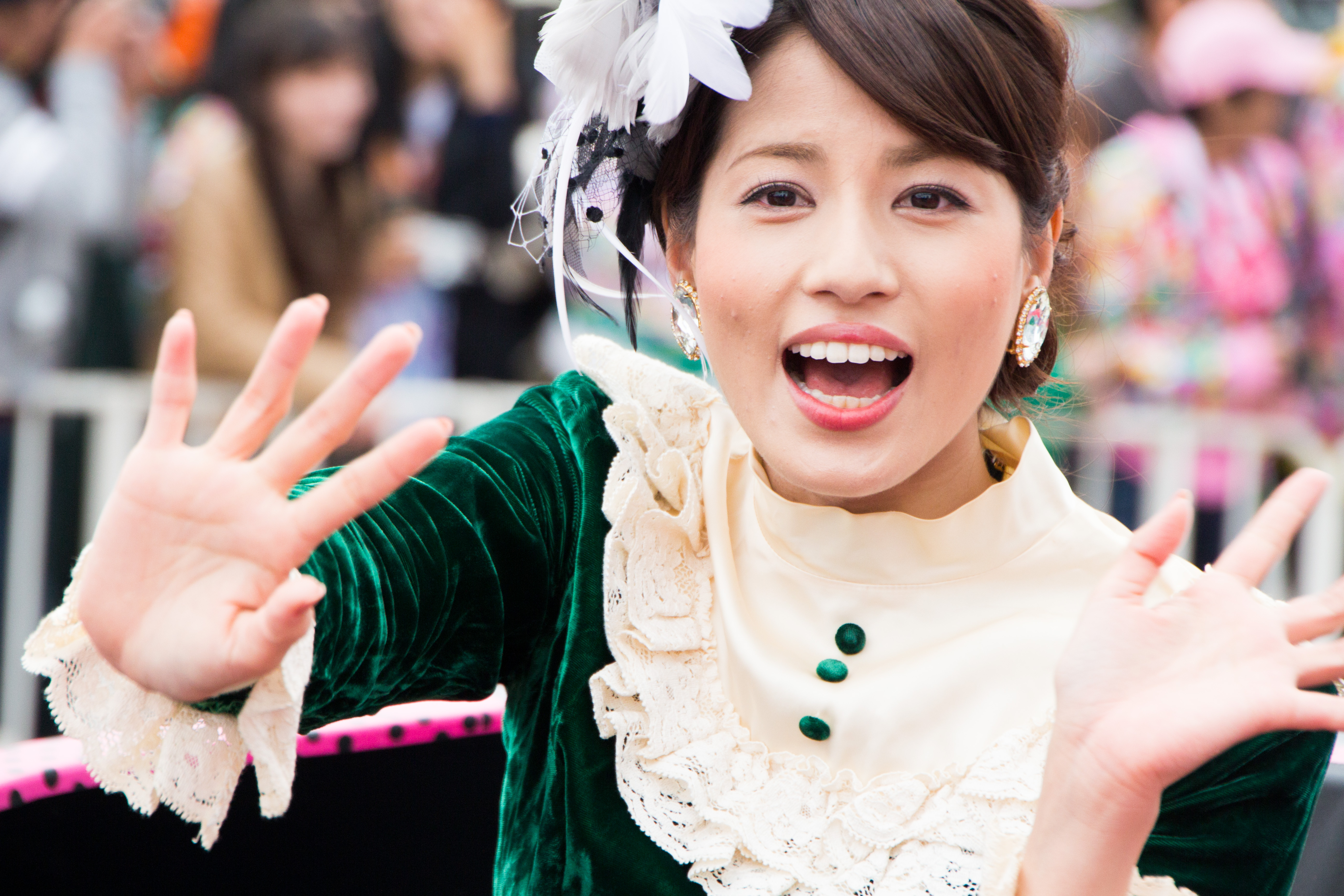
- Yūmi Nagashima in 2016
- Born: November 23, 1991 (age 34); Hyogo Prefecture, Japan
- Education: Kwansei Gakuin University
- Occupations: Announcer; newscaster
- Years active: 2014–present
- Known for: Main presenter of Mezamashi TV
- Spouse: Taku Nishiya (m. 2020)
- Children: 1

Yūmi Nagashima (Japanese: 永島 優美, Nagashima Yūmi, born November 23, 1991) is a Japanese former announcer for Fuji TV. She is known for being the main presenter of Mezamashi TV.

== Early life ==
Nagashima was born on November 23, 1991, in Kobe, Hyogo Prefecture. Her father is Akihiro Nagashima, a former soccer player for the Japan national team and sports commentator. She has a younger brother.

Her mother gave her the name "Yūmi" because she was a big fan of singer Yumi Matsutoya (called Yūmin among her fans).

On January 17, 1995, the Great Hanshin earthquake that occurred when she was three years old, completely destroyed her paternal grandparents' house. The announcer Chisa Takeda was her junior in elementary school.

When she was at Keimei Gakuin High School, she belonged to the cheerleading club. She entered Kwansei Gakuin University in 2010, studying in the Faculty of Sociology. On August 9, 2010, she was elected the first Kobe Wedding Queen. She also won the Grand Prix of Miss Campus of Kwansei Gakuin in 2011.

== Career ==
In 2010, Nagashima was appointed as Kobe City Tourism Goodwill Ambassador.

From October 2012 to March 2013, she was a news reporter for Ohayo Asahi desu Saturday edition on Asahi Broadcasting while she was a university student.

Nagashima joined Fuji TV in April 2014. Her first program there was the late night program Yumipan, the 9th version of the Fuji TV "Pan" series. It lasted one year.

She became the seventh female main presenter of Mezamashi TV in April 2016. On March 29, 2021, she was appointed main presenter of Mezamashi 8, with Shōsuke Tanihara. She left Mezamashi TV, where she had been the female main presenter for five years, since 2016. On March 31, 2023, she left Mezamashi 8, effectively ending her role as morning female main presenter after eight years.After she left, she opened her YouTube account, with some videos where her father appeared.

On March 31, 2025, she left Fuji TV as announcer alongside her senior, Keiko Tsubakihara. After retiring, she plans to work in a sports-related job or in a job promoting fruit.

On March 4, 2026, it was announced that Nagashima, together with Shunsuke Kazama, was appointed as presenter for the JR East's Train Channel's Train TV's new program Urban Information Navigator GoodMove! (都市型情報ナビゲーター GOODMOVE!, Toshigata jōhō nabigētā GOODMOVE). The program's contents include from useful information for daily life to current trends and popular places to visit, all information tailored to consumers' daily commutes.

== Personal life ==
Nagashima revealed on March 3, 2021, that she had been married a year before with a director Taku Nishiya. On July 20, 2023, she announced the pregnancy of her first child. She announced her marriage live on Mezamashi TV the next day. On January 12, 2024 she announced on her Instagram that she had given birth and it was reported on Mezamashi 8 that her child was a girl.
