= Naoya Emura =

Japanese baseball player (born 1992)

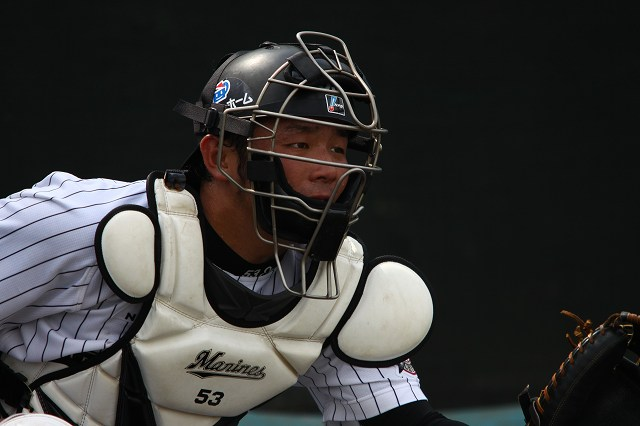
- Emura with the Chiba Lotte Marines

Chiba Lotte Marines – No. 76
- Catcher / Coach
- Born: May 6, 1992 (age 33); Fukuyama, Hiroshima, Japan
- Batted: Right Threw: Right

NPB debut
- March 30, 2013, for the Chiba Lotte Marines

Last NPB appearance
- May 13, 2023, for the Chiba Lotte Marines

Career statistics
- Batting average: .147
- HR: 1
- RBI: 16
- Stats at Baseball Reference

Teams
- As player: Chiba Lotte Marines (2013–2023); As coach: Chiba Lotte Marines (2024–present)

Naoya Emura (江村 直也, Emura Naoya) is a Japanese professional baseball catcher. He was born on May 6, 1992. He is currently playing for the Chiba Lotte Marines of the NPB. His elder brother Masaya is also a professional baseball player who last played for the Tokyo Yakult Swallows as a pitcher.

== Early life ==
Emura graduated from Osaka Tōin High School. From the fall of his second year he became the school's starting catcher and contributed to the school finishing runners-up in the 2009 Kinki tournament, which earned the school a place at the 2010 spring invitational national tournament. During his final year of high school, Emura was drafted by the Marines in the fifth round of the 2010 NPB draft.

== Professional career ==
After two years with Marines' farm team, Emura made his first-team debut early in the 2013 season. On June 3, 2013, in a match between the Marines and the Swallows, Emura faced his rookie brother Masaya for the first time in a professional match. With the count at three balls and one strike, Emura swung at the fifth pitch and grounded out to short stop. In a post-match interview, Masaya described Emura as a "kind younger brother" for swinging at a pitch that was going to be a ball; had he not swung he would've walked to first base. Emura said he "tried too hard" and that he thought his parents would be the happiest at seeing the brothers compete for the first time. Although Masaya won the battle against his brother, Emura's Marines defeated the Swallows 4–0 in the match. By the end of the 2013 season Emura had made 64 appearances for the Marines' first team, finishing with a batting average of .171, 6 runs and 7 RBIs. He made the most appearances out of the Marines' pool of catchers but was mainly used as a bench player, entering matches to replace veterans Tomoya Satozaki, Takeshi Kanazawa and Ryohei Kawamoto.

In 2014 the Marines' veteran catchers were used less due to age and injury, but Emura appeared in only 44 matches as his role was partly taken over by fellow second-year player Tatsuhiro Tamura and rookie Yuuta Yoshida. However, Emura was able to increase his batting average to .208. In 2015 Tamura became the Marines' main catcher, limiting Emura to only 14 first-team matches, in which he failed to record a hit in 7 plate appearances.
