= Sports Kyoushitsu =

Sports Kyoushitsu is a Japanese TV program, broadcast by NHK, focusing on how to coach and play sports. The program began in 1961 and continues to be broadcast every weekend.
