= Mezamashi TV =

Japanese TV series

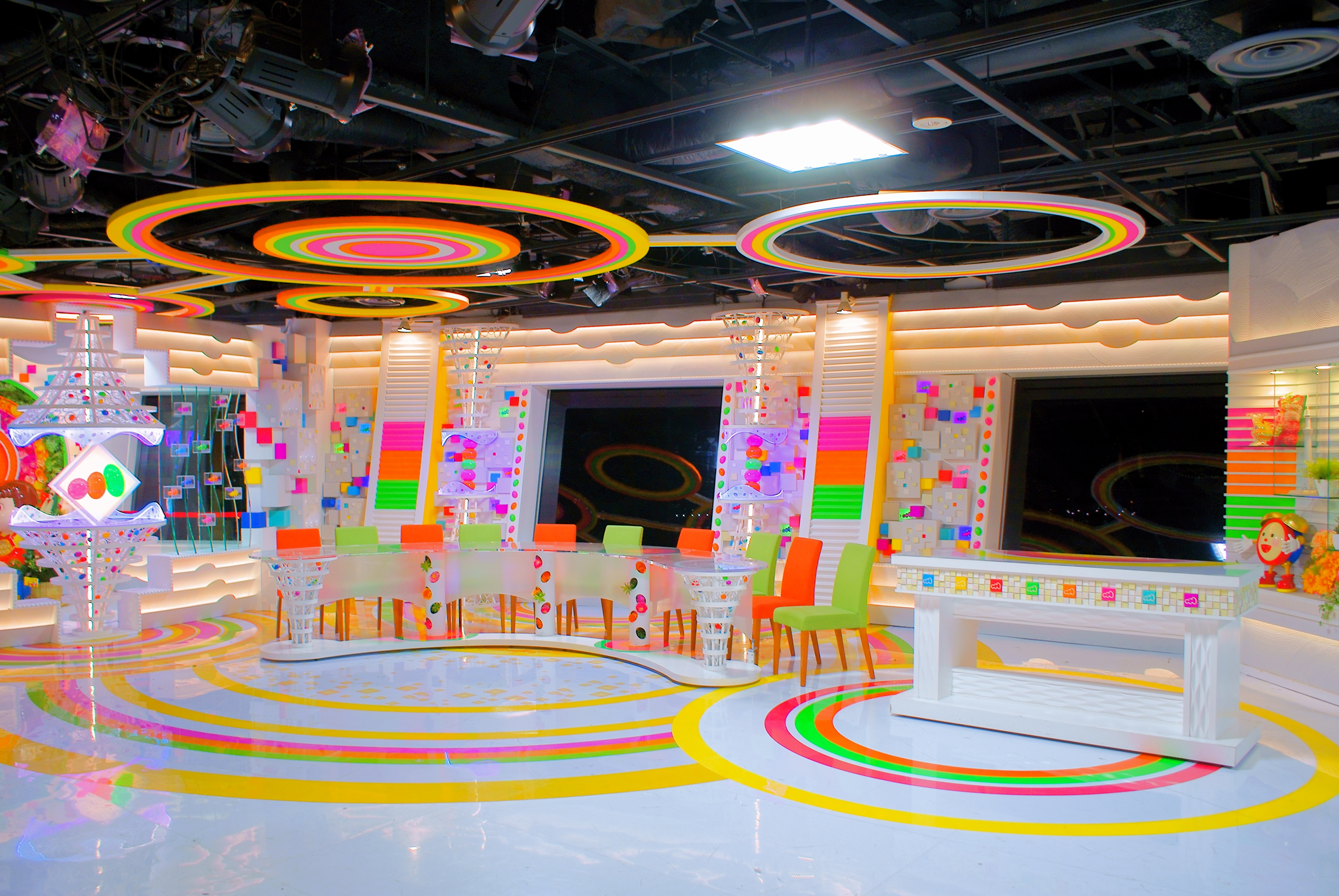
- The Mezamashi TV studio set used from 2012
- Genre: Breakfast television; News
- Opening theme: "朝、月面も笑っている" (Asa, Getsumen mo waratteiru) by DISH
- Country of origin: Japan
- Original language: Japanese

Production
- Running time: 155 minutes
- Production company: Fuji Television

Original release
- Network: FNS (Fuji TV)
- Release: April 1, 1994 – present

Mezamashi TV (めざましテレビ, Mezamashi Terebi) is a Japanese breakfast television program broadcast every weekday on Fuji TV from 4:55 a.m. to 8:00 a.m. Mezamashi is a form of the Japanese verb mezamasu (to wake up).

Mezamashi TV has several spin-off shows such as Mezamashi TV Aqua (めざましテレビ アクア) (replacing Meza News which ended in March 2014), which is aired before Mezamashi TV for viewers in the Kanto region starting at 4:00 am (stations in some areas will air Meza News at 5:00 am) which ended in March 2018 and Mezamashi Saturday (めざましどようび), the Saturday supplement of Mezamashi TV which airs at a later time from 6:00 to 8:30 am, and Mezamashi 8 which is a replacement to Tokudane! from March 29, 2021.

== History ==
In the first half of the 1990s, several news magazine shows of Fuji TV in the morning were discontinued after a short period because of low television ratings. The new show featured two presenters, Norikazu Otsuka and Akiko Yagi. Otsuka was a freelance presenter who had been a presenter at NHK. Mezamashi TV was first broadcast on April 1, 1994.

In 1997, Natsuko Kojima was appointed as an additional main newscaster. In 2003, Aya Takashima was appointed as a new main newscaster.

== Segments ==
=== Kyo no Uranai CountDown! ===
Kyo no Uranai CountDown! (今日の占いカウントダウン！; "today's horoscope countdown") is a fortune-telling segment. This segment has continued since the beginning of Mezamashi TV.

=== Kyo no Wanko ===
Kyo no Wanko (きょうのわんこ; "Today's doggie") is a segment that shows interesting dogs in Japan. This segment has been continuing since 1994. This part is narrated by Kikue Nishiyama.

== Main presenters ==
- Norikazu Otsuka (April 1994 – November 2011)
- Toshihiro Ito (November 2011 – March 2012, October 2024 – present)
- Masaharu Miyake (April 2012 – September 2024)
- Yūmi Nagashima
- Yōko Ozawa (September 2015 – September 2016)
- Shinichi Karube
