= RetroArch =

Emulator and media player frontend

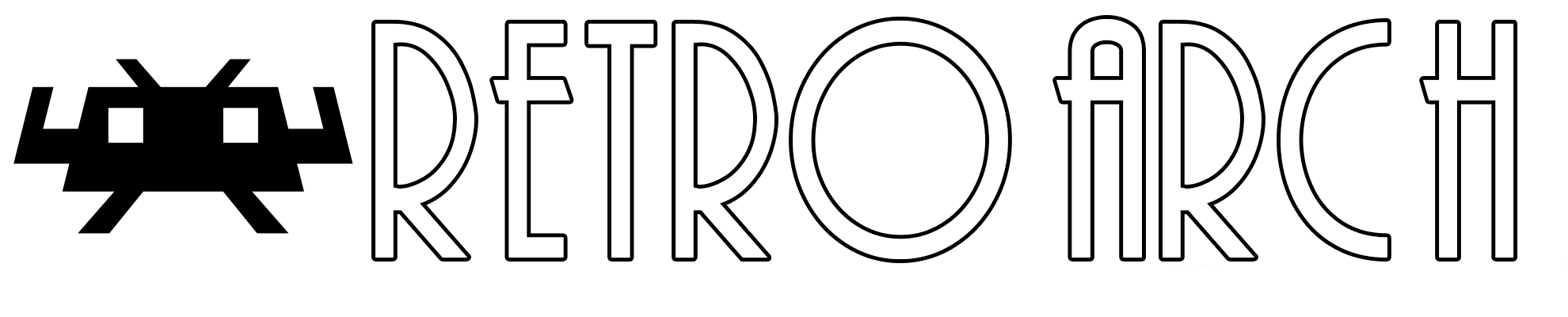

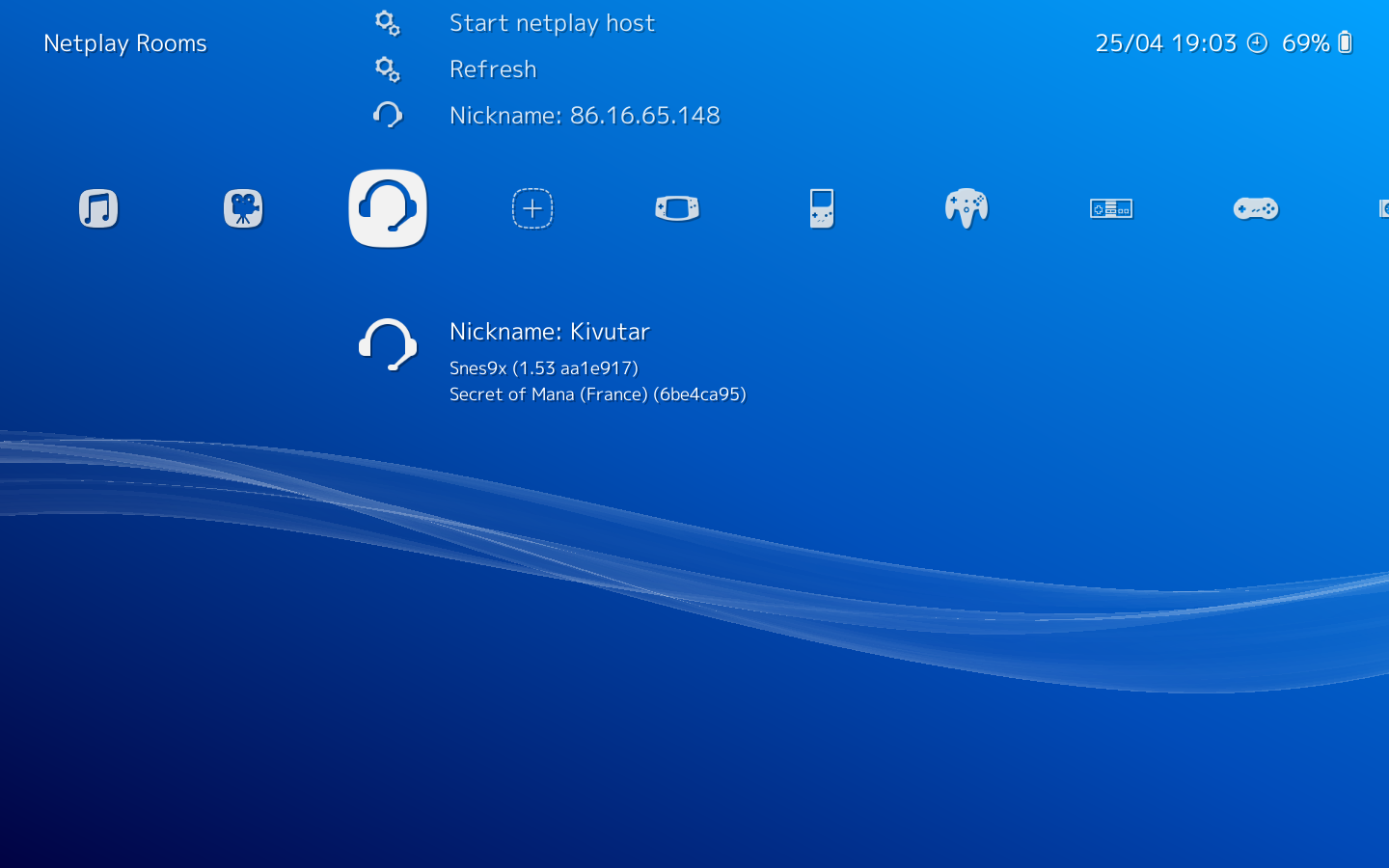
- RetroArch running under the XMB user interface
- Developer: Libretro
- Release: May 26, 2010; 16 years ago
- Stable release: 1.22.2 / 17 November 2025; 12 months ago
- Written in: C++, C
- Operating system: Haiku, Unix-like, Linux, Android, iOS, iPadOS, FreeBSD, macOS, Windows, Xbox Series X and Series S, Xbox One, Xbox, Nintendo Switch, New Nintendo 3DS, New Nintendo 2DS, GameCube, Wii, Wii U, PlayStation 4, PlayStation 3, PlayStation 2, PlayStation Vita, PlayStation Portable, PlayStation Classic, tvOS, webOS, AmigaOS, visionOS
- Platform: IA-32 (x86), x86-64 (x64), ARMv7, AArch64, PowerPC, MIPS, Cell
- Available in: English, Mandarin, Spanish, German, French, Italian, Japanese, Korean, Dutch, Polish, Portuguese, Russian, Vietnamese, Turkish, Arabic, Greek, Persian, Hebrew, Asturian
- Type: Video game console emulator
- License: GNU General Public License, version 3.0
- Website: www.retroarch.com, www.libretro.com
- Repository: github.com/libretro/RetroArch

RetroArch is a free and open-source, cross-platform frontend for emulators, game engines, video games, media players and other applications. It is the reference implementation of the libretro API, designed to be fast, lightweight, portable and without dependencies. It is licensed under the GNU GPLv3. RetroArch runs on many computers, home consoles, handheld consoles, smartphones, smart TV's, single-board computers and web browsers. As of 1 April 2024, versions for PlayStation 4 and PlayStation 3 are not out yet, but are available unofficially.

RetroArch runs programs converted into dynamic libraries called libretro cores, using several user interfaces such as command-line interfaces, a few graphical user interfaces optimized for gamepads, several input, audio and video drivers, and other sophisticated features such as dynamic rate control, audio filters, multi-pass shaders, netplay, gameplay rewinding, cheats, etc.

== History ==
Formerly known as SSNES, initially based on pseudonymous programmer Near's predecessor libsnes, it began its development in 2010 with Hans-Kristian "Themaister" Arntzen committing the first change on GitHub. It was intended as a replacement to bsnes's Qt-based interface but it grew to support more emulation "cores". On April 21, 2012, SSNES was officially renamed to RetroArch to reflect this change in direction.

RetroArch's version 1.0.0.0 was released on January 11, 2014, and at the time was available on seven distinct platforms: OS X, Android, iOS, PlayStation 3, Xbox 360, Wii and GameCube. On February 25, 2014, the version for Microsoft Windows was released. It featured cores for systems: SNES, NES, GB, GBC, GBA, Sega Genesis and Nintendo 64.

On February 16, 2016, RetroArch became one of the first ever applications to implement support for the Vulkan graphics API, having done so on the same day of the API's official release day.

On November 27, 2016, the Libretro Team announced that, alongside Lakka (LibreELEC-based RetroArch operating system), RetroArch would be on the Patreon crowdfunding platform to allow providing bounties for developers who fix specific software bugs and to cover the costs for matchmaking servers.

In December 2016, GoGames – a company contracted by video game developer and publisher Sega – approached the RetroArch developers with the intention of using their software in their SEGA Forever project but ultimately the cooperation did not come to fruition due to licensing disagreements.

In April 2018, an input lag compensation feature called "Run-Ahead" was added.

The Libretro Team planned to release RetroArch onto Steam as a free download, integrating Steamworks features into the platform in July 2019. It would have been the first major dedicated emulation title to be released on the platform at the time.

In 2020, the paraLLel libretro core for RetroArch used the GPU to run the Nintendo 64 at full speed on common consumer hardware, with upscaled graphics and the accuracy of bit-exact low-level renderer Angrylion.

In August 2020, someone impersonating a trusted member of the team got access to the buildbot server and the GitHub account for the libretro organization, causing vandalism and server wipes.

In November 2020, RetroArch in conjunction with a PCSX2 libretro core allowed the Xbox Series X and Series S to emulate the PlayStation 2, something that Sony's own PlayStation 5 could not do at the time.

On September 14, 2021, RetroArch was released on Steam.

On May 15, 2024, RetroArch has returned after three years officially on iOS, iPadOS, tvOS and visionOS through the App Store.

== Features ==
Its major features include:

- Advanced GPU shader support – A multi-pass post-processing shader pipeline to allow efficient usage of image scaling algorithms, emulation of complex CRT, NTSC video artifacts and other effects;
- Dynamic rate control to synchronize video and audio while smoothing out timing imperfections;
- FFmpeg recording – Built-in support for lossless video recording using FFmpeg's libavcodec;
- Gamepad abstraction layer called Retropad;
- Gamepad auto-configuration – Zero-input needed from the user after plugging gamepads in;
- Peer-to-peer netplay that uses a rollback technique similar to GGPO;
- Audio DSP plugins like an equalizer, reverb and other effects;
- Advanced savestate features – Automatic savestate loading, disabling SRAM overwriting, etc.;
- Frame-by-frame gameplay rewinding;
- Button overlays for touchscreen devices like smartphones;
- Thumbnails of game box art;
- Low input and audio lag options;
- Automatically build categorized playlists by scanning directories for games/ROMs;
- Multiple interfaces including: CLI, XMB (optimized for gamepads), GLUI/MaterialUI (optimized for touch devices), RGUI and Ozone (available everywhere);

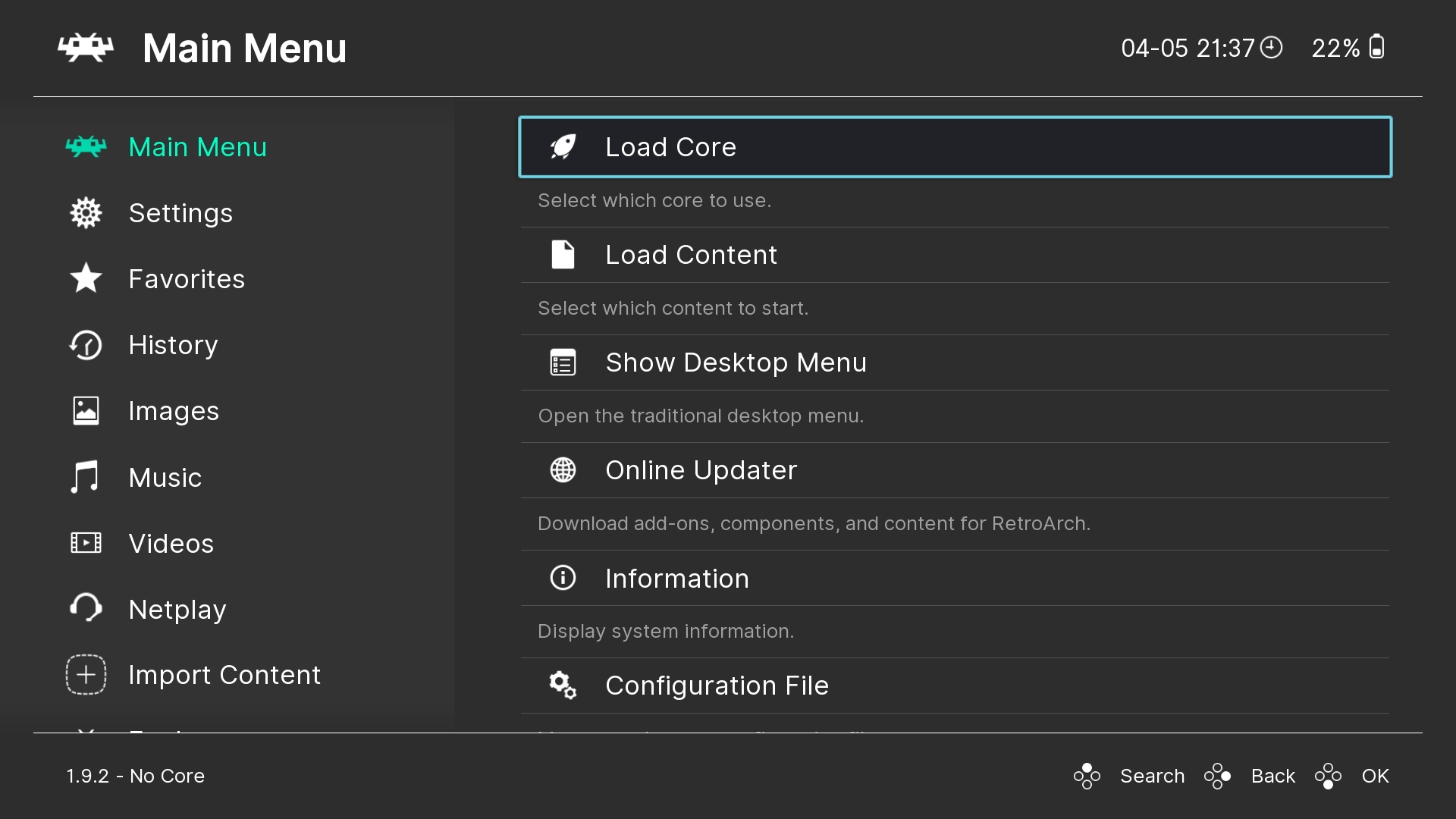
Screenshot of RetroArch running under the Ozone user interface

- Game ROM scanner – Automatically constructs playlists by comparing the hashsums of a directory's files against databases of hashsums of known good game copies;
- Libretro database of cores, games, cheats, etc.;
- OpenGL and Vulkan API support;
- Run-ahead – Hide the input lag of emulated systems by using both savestates and fast-forwarding;
- Achievement tracking – Integration with the RetroAchievements service to unlock trophies and badges;
- AI service – Uses machine translation external services to translate game text on screen.

== Supported systems ==
While RetroArch is available for many platforms, the availability of a specific libretro core varies per platform. This is a non-exhaustive table of which systems are available to RetroArch and what project the core is based on:

System	Computer system/video game console emulator	Platform
3DO	4DO, Opera	PC, iOS, Android
Amiga	PUAE; UAE4ARM	PC, iOS, Android
Amstrad CPC	Caprice32; CrocoDS	PC, iOS, Android
Arcade	MAME; MESS; FinalBurn Neo; FinalBurn Alpha	PC, iOS, Android
Atari 2600	Stella	PC, iOS, Android
Atari 5200	a5200 Atari800	PC, iOS, Android
Atari 7800	ProSystem	PC, iOS, Android
Atari 8-bit computers	Atari800	PC, iOS, Android
Atari Falcon/Atari ST	Hatari	PC
Jaguar	Virtual Jaguar	PC
Atari Lynx	Mednafen; Lynx	PC, iOS, Android
BBC Micro	Acorn	PC, iOS, Android
ColecoVision	blueMSX; Gearcoleco	PC, iOS, Android
Commodore 64	VICE; Frodo	PC, iOS, Android
Commodore 128	VICE	PC, iOS, Android
CBM-II	VICE	PC, iOS, Android
PET	VICE	PC, iOS, Android
Plus/4	VICE	PC, iOS, Android
VIC-20	VICE	PC, iOS, Android
MS-DOS	DOSBox; DOSBox-Pure; DOSBox-SVN	PC, iOS, Android
Electronika BK-0010/BK-0011	M	PC
Fairchild Channel F	FreeChaF	PC, iOS, Android
Handheld electronic game	GW	PC, iOS, Android
Intellivision	FreeIntv	PC, iOS, Android
Mac II	minivmac	PC
Mega Duck	SameDuck	PC
MSX	fMSX blueMSX	PC, iOS, Android
PC Engine / CD	Mednafen	PC, iOS, Android
TurboGrafx-16 / SuperGrafx	Mednafen	PC, iOS, Android
PC-8000 / PC-88	QUASI88	PC
PC-98	Neko Project II Kai; Neko Project II	PC, iOS, Android
PC-FX	Mednafen	PC, iOS, Android
TurboGrafx-CD	Mednafen	PC
Neo Geo Pocket / Color	Mednafen; RACE	PC, iOS, Android
Nintendo 3DS	Citra; Citra 2018	PC
Nintendo 64	Mupen64Plus; Mupen64Plus-Next; ParaLLEl N64	PC, iOS, Android
Nintendo DS	DeSmuME; DeSmuME 2015 melonDS	PC, iOS, Android
Nintendo Entertainment System	higan Emux; FCEUmm; Nestopia UE; QuickNES; Mesen	PC, iOS, Android
Famicom Disk System	FCEUmm; Mesen; Nestopia higan QuickNES	PC, iOS, Android
Game Boy / Color	Emux; Gambatte; SameBoy; TGB Dual higan Mesen-S	PC, iOS, Android
Game Boy Advance	Mednafen gpSP; Meteor mGBA; VisualBoyAdvance	PC, iOS, Android
GameCube	Dolphin	PC, Android
Wii	Dolphin	PC, Android
Nintendo Pokémon Mini	PokeMini	PC, iOS, Android
Odyssey²	O2EM	PC
Palm OS	Mu	PC, iOS, Android
CD-i	SAME CDi; Cdi 2015	PC
PlayStation	Mednafen; PCSX ReARMed; DuckStation; SwanStation	PC, iOS, Android
PlayStation 2	Play! PCSX2	PC
PlayStation Portable	PPSSPP	PC, iOS, Android
Super NES	higan Mednafen bsnes Snes9x; Mesen-S	PC, iOS, Android
32X	PicoDrive	PC, iOS, Android
Dreamcast	Redream; Flycast (formerly Reicast)	PC
Game Gear	Genesis Plus GX; PicoDrive; SMS Plus GX; Gearsystem	PC, iOS, Android
Master System	PicoDrive; Genesis Plus GX; SMS Plus GX; Gearsystem	PC, iOS, Android
Genesis/Mega Drive	Genesis Plus GX; BlastEm; PicoDrive; ClownMDEmu	PC, iOS, Android
Sega CD/Mega-CD	Genesis Plus GX; PicoDrive; ClownMDEmu	PC, iOS, Android
Saturn	uoYabause; Mednafen; YabaSanshiro; Kronos	PC, iOS, Android
Sega ST-V	Kronos	PC
Sega VMU	VeMUlator	PC
SG-1000	blueMSX; Gearsystem	PC, iOS, Android
Sharp X1	X Millennium	PC
Spectravideo	blueMSX	PC, iOS, Android
Super Cassette Vision	Libretro-EmuSCV (Note: Binaries on the Author Website.)	PC
Thomson computers	Theodore	PC, iOS, Android
Uzebox	Uzem	PC
Vectrex	Vecx	PC, iOS, Android
Virtual Boy	Mednafen	PC, iOS, Android
Watara Supervision	Potator	PC, iOS, Android
WonderSwan	Mednafen, Beetle Cygne	PC, iOS, Android
X68000	PX68k	PC, iOS, Android
ZX81	EightyOne	PC
ZX Spectrum	Fuse	PC, iOS, Android

== Reception ==
RetroArch has been praised for the number of systems and games it can play under a single interface.

It has been criticized for how difficult it is to configure, due to the extensive number of options available to the user, and at the same time has been praised for the more advanced features it possesses.

On Android, it has been praised for the fact that overlays can be customized, for the expandability of the libretro cores it supports, for its compatibility with several USB and Bluetooth controller peripherals, in addition to the app being free and having no ads.

Kyle Orland, writing for Ars Technica, said that RetroArch's 'Run-Ahead' feature is "arguably the biggest improvement to the experience the retro gaming community has yet seen".

== See also ==
- List of free and open-source software packages
- List of video game emulators
