= List of video game console emulators =

The following is a list of notable video game console emulators.

== Arcade ==
- Visual Pinball

== Atari ==
Atari 2600

- Stella

== Nintendo ==
=== Home consoles ===
Nintendo Entertainment System

- FCEUX
- NESticle
- Nestopia

Super NES

- Snes9x
- ZSNES
- Higan

Nintendo 64

- Mupen64Plus
- Project64
- Project Unreality
- UltraHLE

GameCube/Wii

- Dolphin

Wii U

- Cemu

=== Handhelds ===
Game Boy

- Wzonka-Lad

Game Boy Advance

- VisualBoyAdvance (Also supports Game Boy and Game Boy Color)
  - VisualBoyAdvance-M

Nintendo 3DS

- Citra

=== Hybrid ===
Nintendo Switch

- Yuzu
- Ryujinx

== SNK ==
Neo Geo CD

- NeoCD

== Sony ==
=== Home consoles ===
PlayStation

- bleem!
- bleemcast!
- Connectix Virtual Game Station
- ePSXe
- PCSX-Reloaded
- DuckStation

PlayStation 2

- PCSX2

PlayStation 3

- RPCS3

PlayStation 4

- ShadPS4

(A website promoting a supposed PS4 emulator, "PCSX4", is a scam.)

PlayStation 5

- KytyPS5

=== Handhelds ===
PlayStation Portable

- PPSSPP

PlayStation Vita

- Vita3K

== Frontends ==
- RetroArch
- Delta

== Multi-system emulators ==
Multi-system emulators are capable of emulating the functionality of multiple systems.

- higan
- MAME (Multiple Arcade Machine Emulator)
- Mednafen
- MESS (Multi Emulator Super System), formerly a stand-alone application and now part of MAME
- OpenEmu

== See also ==
- Emulator
- List of computer system emulators
- List of emulators
- Video game console emulator
