= Mednafen =

Emulator for multiple systems

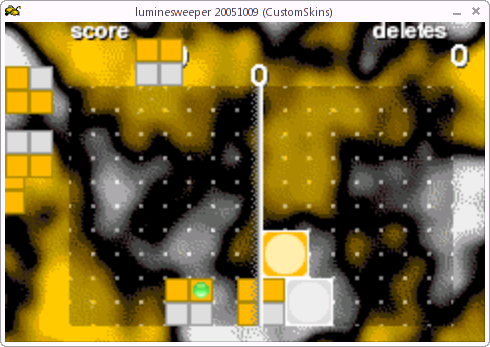
- Mednafen emulating the GBA game luminesweeper
- Other names: Nintencer
- Developer: Mednafen Team
- Stable release: 1.32.1 / April 5, 2024; 18 months ago
- Preview release: 1.32.0-UNSTABLE / January 9, 2024; 21 months ago
- Written in: C++
- Operating system: Windows, macOS, Linux, BSD, PlayStation 3, RISC OS, Wii, AmigaOS
- Platform: IA-32, x86-64, PowerPC
- Size: 7.49 MB: Windows, x64 5.57 MB: Windows, x86 3.05 MB: Source code
- Type: Video game console emulator
- License: GPL-2.0-or-later
- Website: mednafen.github.io

Mednafen (My Emulator Doesn't Need A Frickin' Excellent Name), formerly known as Nintencer, is an OpenGL and SDL multi-system free software wrapper that bundles various original and third-party emulation cores into a single package, and is driven by command-line input. It is distributed under the terms of the GPL-2.0-or-later license. Certain emulation cores of Mednafen have been ported to RetroArch/Libretro.

RetroArch's fork Beetle-PSX supports additional features, including hardware rendering (Vulkan and OpenGL), higher internal resolution, anti-aliasing, texture filtering, texture replacement, post-processing shaders, GTE subpixel precision and perspective-correct texture mapping.

The emulator runs under Microsoft Windows, Linux, AmigaOS, OpenBSD, PlayStation 3, RISC OS, and Wii.

== Supported systems ==
System	Computer system/video game console emulator
Apple II/Apple II Plus	Original
Atari Lynx	Handy
Game Boy / Color	VisualBoyAdvance
Game Boy Advance	VisualBoyAdvance
Game Gear	SMS Plus by Charles MacDonald
Master System	SMS Plus by Charles MacDonald
Neo Geo Pocket / Color	NeoPop
Nintendo Entertainment System	FCE Ultra
PC Engine SuperGrafx	Unknown
PC-FX	Original. NEC V810 CPU core based on Reality Boy
PlayStation	Original
Sega Genesis	Genesis Plus by Charles MacDonald
Sega Saturn	Original
Super Nintendo Entertainment System	bsnes
TurboGrafx-16 / TurboGrafx-CD	Original. CD-ROM interface based on PC2e
Virtual Boy	Original. NEC V810 CPU core based on Reality Boy
WonderSwan	Cygne

== Front-ends ==
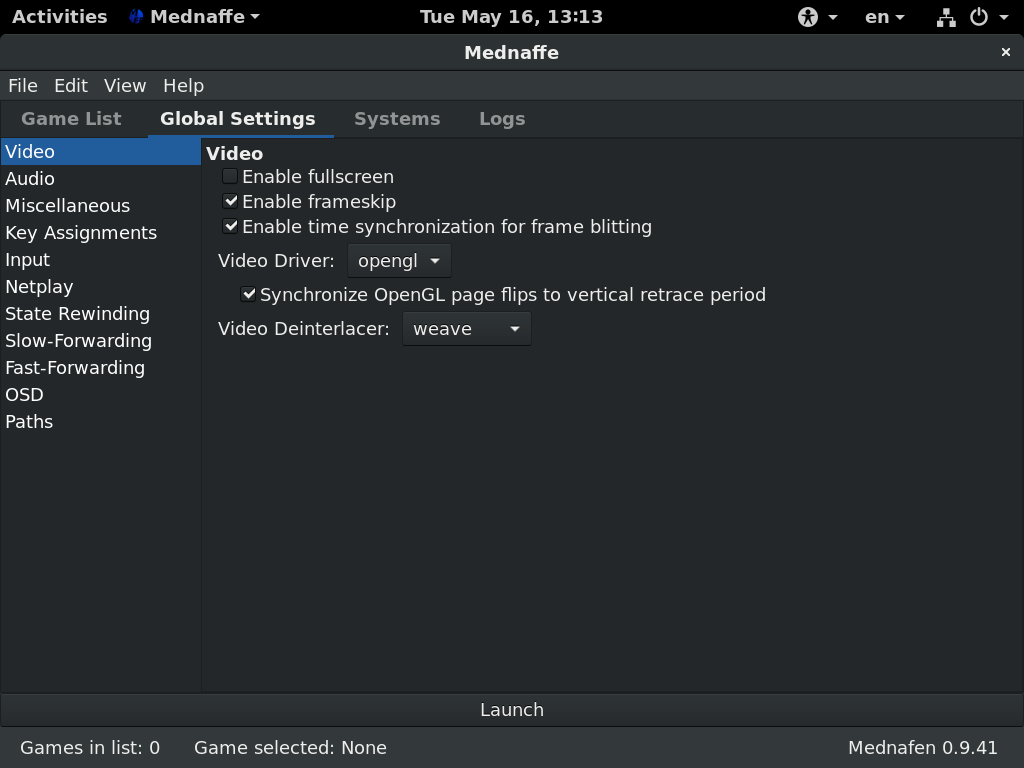
Mednaffe v0.8.4 on Debian

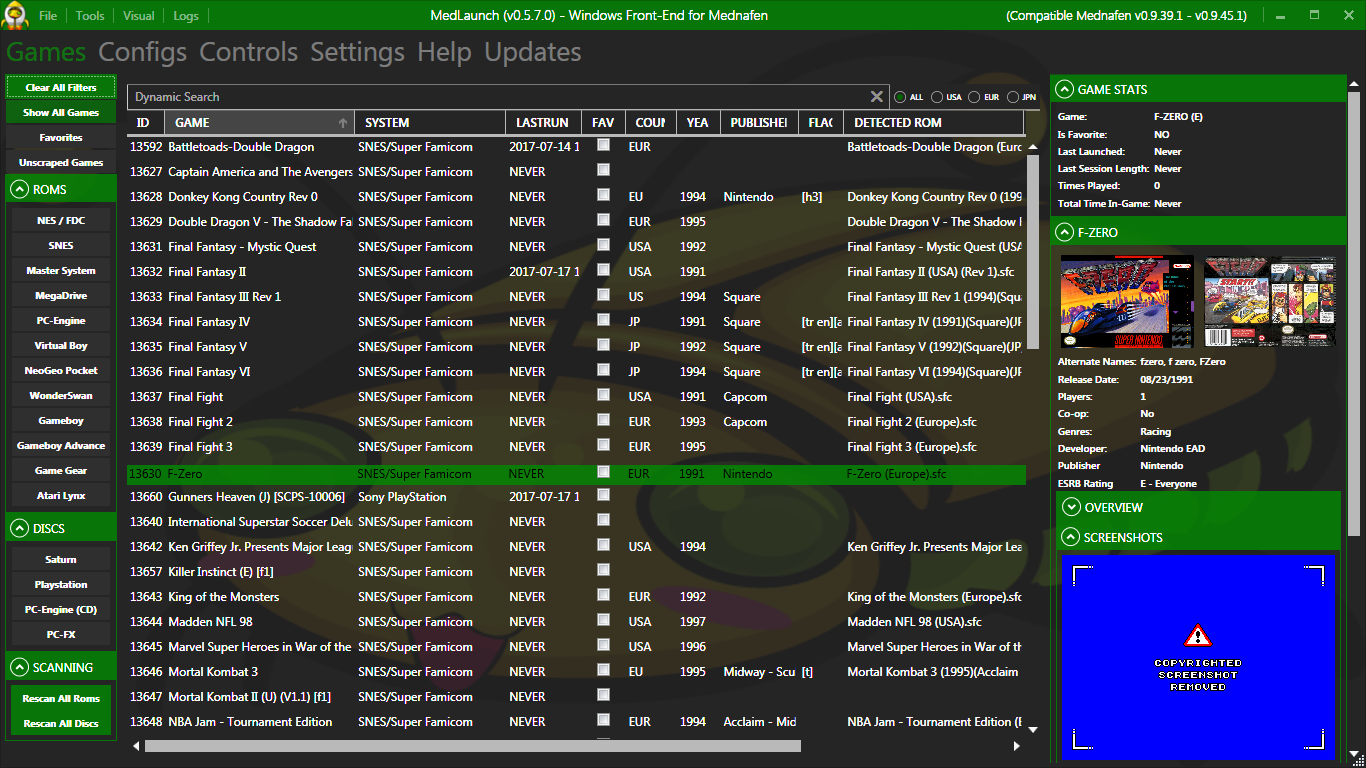
MedLaunch v0.5.7.0 running on Windows 7

There are a number of open-source graphical front-ends for Mednafen actively being developed.

GUI	Operating System	Description	Repository
Mednaffe	Linux and Windows	Mednaffe is written in C (programming language) and uses GTK, it allows all of Mednafen's options to be configured, and provides simple game-management features.	
MedLaunch	Windows	MedLaunch is written in C# WPF using .NET 4.5.2. It allows all Mednafen options and controllers to be configured and includes a dynamic games library with DAT file lookup and online scraping.	
MedGui Reborn	Windows	MedGui Reborn is written in VB .NET using .NET Framework 2.0, It supports all Mednafen options, includes a lot of game utility and an easy way to perform Net Play session.	
MedSat	Windows	MedSat only supports Sega Saturn emulation.	

== See also ==
- List of video game console emulators
- Computer system
