= Cemu =

Emulator for Wii U software

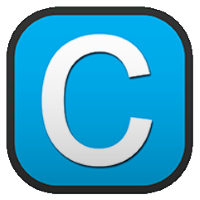

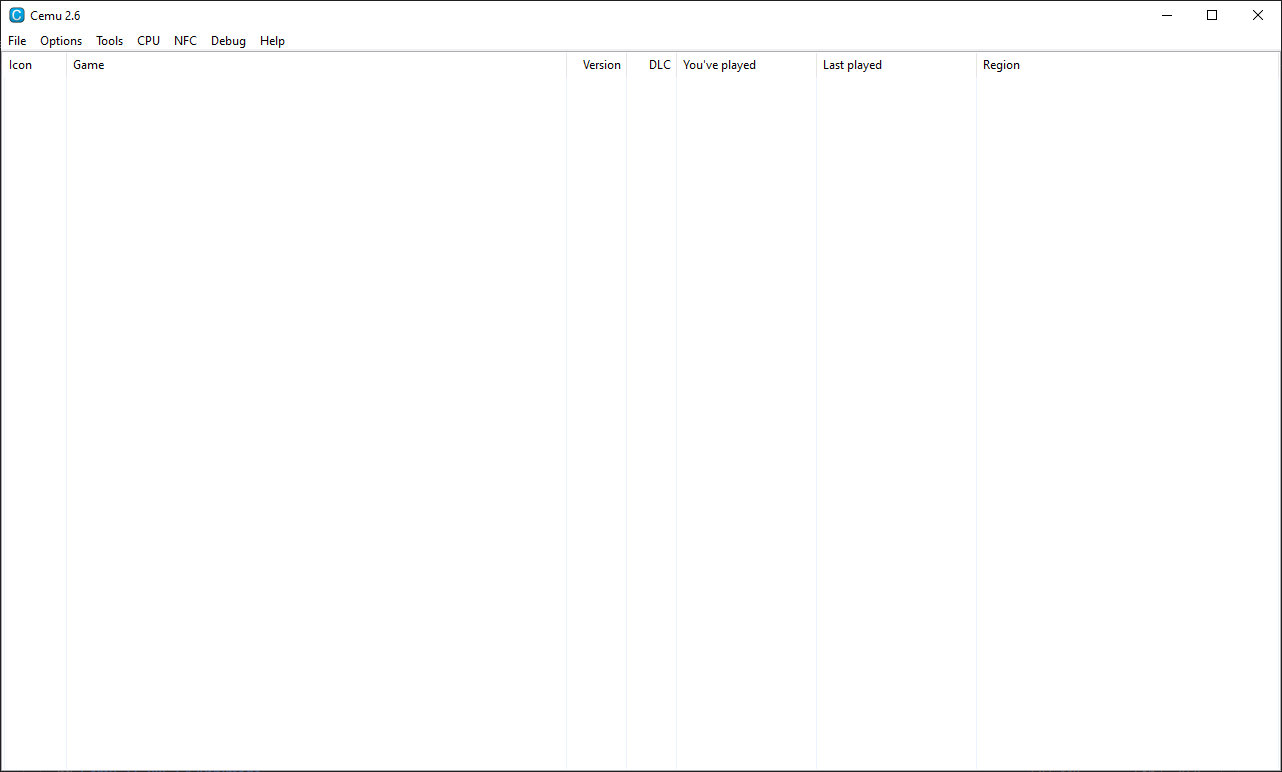
- Cemu 2.6 running on Windows 10
- Original authors: Exzap; Petergov
- Developer: Team Cemu
- Release: October 13, 2015; 11 years ago
- Stable release: 2.6 / February 6, 2025; 21 months ago
- Written in: C, C++
- Operating system: Microsoft Windows, Linux, macOS
- Size: 25.0 MB compressed (Windows)
- Available in: English
- Type: Video game console emulator
- License: Mozilla Public License 2.0
- Website: cemu.info
- Repository: github.com/cemu-project/Cemu

Cemu is a free and open-source Wii U emulator, first released on October 13, 2015 for Microsoft Windows as a closed-source emulator developed by Exzap and Petergov. With the release of Cemu 2.1 on August 27, 2024 it gained stable support for Linux and macOS. Though still under development, it is able to run the majority of games smoothly, assuming compatible hardware. The popularity of the emulator spiked with the release of The Legend of Zelda: Breath of the Wild in 2017 as Cemu successfully booted and ran the title within hours of its release.

== Development ==
Designed as a proof-of-concept, the initial release of Cemu was able to successfully boot Mario Kart 8 and The Legend of Zelda: The Wind Waker HD yet lacked Wii U GamePad support and audio and suffered from stutters and video glitches. Cemu could run on 64-bit Windows operating systems and only supported OpenGL 3.3 on release. Despite the Wii U sharing a similar name as its predecessor, the Wii, the emulator was built independently from Dolphin, a Wii emulator, as the systems only shared their CPU architecture in common. The emulator would rapidly progress from this state and increase its compatibility with the Wii U game library and add more features.

A couple of days after The Legend of Zelda: Breath of the Wild released, Cemu was able to boot the game - though running at a sluggish framerate, without audio, and filled with many glitches. The anticipation for emulation of The Legend of Zelda: Breath of the Wild caused the emulator's Patreon to increase monthly donations to $7,400 per month and later $22,317 per month. Developers of Cemu expected that The Legend of Zelda: Breath of the Wild would be playable with only a few months worth of work, and had a rudimentary version of the game's tutorial playable within weeks of its release. Cutscenes were made available with a community-made add-on called Cemuhook, though Cemu 1.18.0 removed the need for the plugin.

== Reception ==
The emulator has received positive reception on its ability to play Wii U games on PC at higher resolutions than 1080p, the base resolution of the console, via the usage of community graphics packs. For example Mario Kart 8 and The Legend of Zelda: Breath of the Wild can be run in 4K resolution on compatible hardware. Many mods and enhancements have been developed for The Legend of Zelda: Breath of the Wild; in August 2017, a hack to Cemu Emulator developed by Cemu community member Xalphenos allowed The Legend of Zelda: Breath of the Wild to run at 60 frames per second (FPS), higher than the game's native 30 FPS limit.

Unlike other emulators, Cemu was notably not open source from its inception until 2022. Exzap explained that it allows for quick progress and for more control of its development. However, the decision drew criticism from other emulation developers. Higan creator Byuu, later known as Near, condemned the Cemu's closed-source nature, arguing that Cemu benefitted from the work of previous emulators without contributing back. Pierre Bourdon, a Dolphin developer, also disagreed with its commercial status, expressing concern that high paying donors could influence the emulator's development team to favour certain bug fixes or games to support. In January 2022, Exzap revealed Cemu's roadmap, stating that Cemu is planned to go open source in 2022. Seven months later, in its 2.0 release, Cemu became open source under the Mozilla Public License, and introduced its first builds for Linux, and later for macOS.

== See also ==
- Citra, the first Nintendo 3DS emulator
- Yuzu, a Nintendo Switch emulator
- List of video game console emulators
