= Emulator =

System allowing a device to imitate another

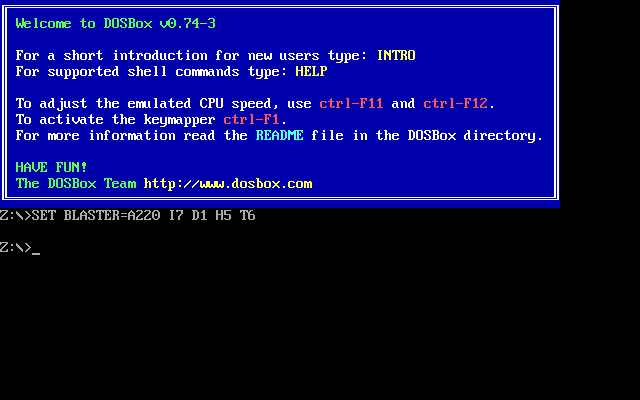
DOSBox emulates the command-line interface of DOS.

In computing, an emulator is hardware or software that enables one computer system (called the host) to behave like another computer system (called the guest). An emulator typically enables the host system to run software or use peripheral devices designed for the guest system. Emulation refers to the ability of a computer program in an electronic device to emulate (or imitate) another program or device.

Many printers, for example, are designed to emulate HP LaserJet printers because a significant amount of software is written specifically for HP models. If a non-HP printer emulates an HP printer, any software designed for an actual HP printer will also function on the non-HP device, producing equivalent print results. Since at least the 1990s, many video game enthusiasts and hobbyists have used emulators to play classic arcade games from the 1980s using the games' original 1980s machine code and data, which is interpreted by a current-era system, and to emulate old video game consoles (see video game console emulator).

A hardware emulator is an emulator which takes the form of a hardware device. Examples include the DOS-compatible card installed in some 1990s-era Macintosh computers, such as the Centris 610 or Performa 630, that allowed them to run personal computer (PC) software programs and field-programmable gate array-based hardware emulators. The Church–Turing thesis implies that theoretically, any operating environment can be emulated within any other environment, assuming memory limitations are ignored. However, in practice, it can be quite difficult, particularly when the exact behavior of the system to be emulated is not documented and has to be deduced through reverse engineering. It also says nothing about timing constraints; if the emulator does not perform as quickly as it did using the original hardware, the software inside the emulation may run much more slowly (possibly triggering timer interrupts that alter behavior).

"Can a Commodore 64 emulate MS-DOS?" Yes, it's possible for a [Commodore] 64 to emulate an IBM PC [which uses MS-DOS], in the same sense that it's possible to bail out Lake Michigan with a teaspoon.

— Letter to Compute! and editorial answer, April 1988

== Types ==
Windows XP running an Archimedes emulator, which is in turn running a ZX Spectrum emulator

Tetris running on the Wzonka-Lad Game Boy emulator on AmigaOS, itself running on E-UAE on a modern Fedora Linux system

Most emulators just emulate a hardware architecture—if operating system firmware or software is required for the desired software, it must be provided as well (and may itself be emulated). Both the operating system and the software will then be interpreted by the emulator, rather than being run by native hardware. Apart from this interpreter for the emulated binary machine's language, some other hardware (such as input or output devices) must be provided in virtual form as well; for example, if writing to a specific memory location should influence what is displayed on the screen, then this would need to be emulated. While emulation could, if taken to the extreme, go down to the atomic level, basing its output on a simulation of the actual circuitry from a virtual power source, this would be a highly unusual solution. Emulators typically stop at a simulation of the documented hardware specifications and digital logic. Sufficient emulation of some hardware platforms requires extreme accuracy, down to the level of individual clock cycles, undocumented features, unpredictable analog elements, and implementation bugs. This is particularly the case with classic home computers such as the Commodore 64, whose software often depends on highly sophisticated low-level programming tricks invented by game programmers and the "demoscene".

In contrast, some other platforms have had very little use of direct hardware addressing, such as an emulator for the PlayStation 4. In these cases, a simple compatibility layer may suffice. This translates system calls for the foreign system into system calls for the host system e.g., the Linux compatibility layer used on *BSD to run closed source Linux native software on FreeBSD and NetBSD. For example, while the Nintendo 64 graphic processor was fully programmable, most games used one of a few pre-made programs, which were mostly self-contained and communicated with the game via FIFO; therefore, many emulators do not emulate the graphic processor at all, but simply interpret the commands received from the CPU as the original program would. Developers of software for embedded systems or video game consoles often design their software on especially accurate emulators called simulators before trying it on the real hardware. This is so that software can be produced and tested before the final hardware exists in large quantities, so that it can be tested without taking the time to copy the program to be debugged at a low level and without introducing the side effects of a debugger. In many cases, the simulator is actually produced by the company providing the hardware, which theoretically increases its accuracy. Math co-processor emulators allow programs compiled with math instructions to run on machines that do not have the co-processor installed, but the extra work done by the CPU may slow the system down. If a math coprocessor is not installed or present on the CPU, when the CPU executes any co-processor instruction it will make a determined interrupt (coprocessor not available), calling the math emulator routines. When the instruction is successfully emulated, the program continues executing.

=== Logic simulators ===
Logic simulation is the use of a computer program to simulate the operation of a digital circuit such as a processor. This is done after a digital circuit has been designed in logic equations, but before the circuit is fabricated in hardware.

=== Functional emulators ===
Functional simulation is the use of a computer program to simulate the execution of a second computer program written in symbolic assembly language or compiler language, rather than in binary machine code. By using a functional simulator, programmers can execute and trace selected sections of source code to search for programming errors (bugs), without generating binary code. This is distinct from simulating execution of binary code, which is software emulation. The first functional simulator was written by Autonetics about 1960 for testing assembly language programs for later execution in military computer D-17B. This made it possible for flight programs to be written, executed, and tested before D-17B computer hardware had been built. Autonetics also programmed a functional simulator for testing flight programs for later execution in the military computer D-37C.

=== Video game console emulators ===
Video game console emulators are programs that allow a personal computer or video game console to emulate another video game console. They are most often used to play older 1980s to 2000s-era video games on modern personal computers and more contemporary video game consoles. They are also used to translate games into other languages, to modify existing games, and in the development process of "home brew" DIY demos and in the creation of new games for older systems. The Internet has helped in the spread of console emulators, as most - if not all - would be unavailable for sale in retail outlets. Examples of console emulators that have been released in the last few decades are: RPCS3, Dolphin, Cemu, PCSX2, PPSSPP, ZSNES, Citra, ePSXe, Project64, Visual Boy Advance, Nestopia, and Yuzu.

Due to their popularity, emulators have been impersonated by malware. Most of these emulators are for video game consoles like the Xbox 360, Xbox One, Nintendo 3DS, etc. Generally such emulators make currently impossible claims such as being able to run Xbox One and Xbox 360 games in a single program.

==== Legal issues ====
As computers and global computer networks continued to advance and emulator developers grew more skilled in their work, the length of time between the commercial release of a console and its successful emulation began to shrink. Fifth generation consoles such as Nintendo 64, PlayStation and sixth generation handhelds, such as the Game Boy Advance, saw significant progress toward emulation during their production. This led to an effort by console manufacturers to stop unofficial emulation, but consistent failures such as Sega v. Accolade 977 F.2d 1510 (9th Cir. 1992), Sony Computer Entertainment, Inc. v. Connectix Corporation 203 F.3d 596 (2000), and Sony Computer Entertainment America v. Bleem 214 F.3d 1022 (2000), have had the opposite effect. According to all legal precedents, emulation is legal within the United States. However, unauthorized distribution of copyrighted code remains illegal, according to both country-specific copyright and international copyright law under the Berne Convention. Under United States law, obtaining a dumped copy of the original machine's BIOS is legal under the ruling Lewis Galoob Toys, Inc. v. Nintendo of America, Inc., (9th Cir. 1992) as fair use as long as the user obtained a legally purchased copy of the machine. To mitigate this however, several emulators for platforms such as Game Boy Advance are capable of running without a BIOS file, using high-level emulation to simulate BIOS subroutines at a slight cost in emulation accuracy.

=== Terminal ===
Terminal emulators are software programs that provide modern computers and devices interactive access to applications running on mainframe computer operating systems or other host systems such as HP-UX or OpenVMS. Terminals such as the IBM 3270 or VT100 and many others are no longer produced as physical devices. Instead, software running on modern operating systems simulates a "dumb" terminal and is able to render the graphical and text elements of the host application, send keystrokes and process commands using the appropriate terminal protocol. Some terminal emulation applications include Attachmate Reflection, IBM Personal Communications, and Micro Focus Rumba.

=== Other types ===
Other types of emulators include:

- Hardware emulator: the process of imitating the behavior of one or more pieces of hardware (typically a system under design) with another piece of hardware, typically a special purpose emulation system
- In-circuit emulator: the use of a hardware device to debug the software of an embedded system
- Floating-point emulator: Some floating-point hardware only supports the simplest operations: addition, subtraction, and multiplication. In systems without any floating-point hardware, the CPU emulates it using a series of simpler fixed-point arithmetic operations that run on the integer arithmetic logic unit.
- Instruction set simulator in a high-level programming language: Mimics the behavior of a mainframe or microprocessor by "reading" instructions and maintaining internal variables which represent the processor's registers.
- Network emulation: a technique for testing the performance of real applications over a virtual network. This is different from network simulation where virtual models of traffic, network models, channels, and protocols are applied.
- Server emulator: Multiplayer video games often rely on an online game server, which may or may not be available for on-premises installation. A server emulator is an unofficial on-premises server that imitates the behavior of the official online server, even though its internal working might be different.
- Semulation: the process of controlling an emulation through a simulator

== Structure and organization ==
Typically, an emulator is divided into modules that correspond roughly to the emulated computer's subsystems. Most often, an emulator will be composed of the following modules:

- a CPU emulator or CPU simulator (the two terms are mostly interchangeable in this case), unless the target being emulated has the same CPU architecture as the host, in which case a virtual machine layer may be used instead
- a memory subsystem module
- various input/output (I/O) device emulators

Buses are often not emulated, either for reasons of performance or simplicity, and virtual peripherals communicate directly with the CPU or the memory subsystem.

=== Memory subsystem ===
It is possible for the memory subsystem emulation to be reduced to simply an array of elements each sized like an emulated word; however, this model fails very quickly as soon as any location in the computer's logical memory does not match physical memory. This clearly is the case whenever the emulated hardware allows for advanced memory management (in which case, the MMU logic can be embedded in the memory emulator, made a module of its own, or sometimes integrated into the CPU simulator). Even if the emulated computer does not feature an MMU, though, there are usually other factors that break the equivalence between logical and physical memory: many (if not most) architectures offer memory-mapped I/O; even those that do not often have a block of logical memory mapped to ROM, which means that the memory-array module must be discarded if the read-only nature of ROM is to be emulated. Features such as bank switching or segmentation may also complicate memory emulation. As a result, most emulators implement at least two procedures for writing to and reading from logical memory, and it is these procedures' duty to map every access to the correct location of the correct object.

On a base-limit addressing system where memory from address 0 to address ROMSIZE-1 is read-only memory, while the rest is RAM, something along the line of the following procedures would be typical:

void WriteMemory(word Address, word Value) {
  word RealAddress;
  RealAddress = Address + BaseRegister;
  if ((RealAddress < LimitRegister) &&
    (RealAddress > ROMSIZE)) {
    Memory[RealAddress] = Value;
  } else {
    RaiseInterrupt(INT_SEGFAULT);
  }
}

word ReadMemory(word Address) {
  word RealAddress;
  RealAddress=Address+BaseRegister;
  if (RealAddress < LimitRegister) {
    return Memory[RealAddress];
  } else {
    RaiseInterrupt(INT_SEGFAULT);
    return NULL;
  }
}

=== CPU simulator ===
The CPU simulator is often the most complicated part of an emulator. Many emulators are written using "pre-packaged" CPU simulators, in order to concentrate on good and efficient emulation of a specific machine. The simplest form of a CPU simulator is an interpreter, which is a computer program that follows the execution flow of the emulated program code and, for every machine code instruction encountered, executes operations on the host processor that are semantically equivalent to the original instructions. This is made possible by assigning a variable to each register and flag of the simulated CPU. The logic of the simulated CPU can then more or less be directly translated into software algorithms, creating a software re-implementation that basically mirrors the original hardware implementation.

The following example illustrates how CPU simulation can be accomplished by an interpreter. In this case, interrupts are checked-for before every instruction executed, though this behavior is rare in real emulators for performance reasons (it is generally faster to use a subroutine to do the work of an interrupt).

void Execute(void) {
  if (Interrupt != INT_NONE) {
    SuperUser = TRUE;
    WriteMemory(++StackPointer, ProgramCounter);
    ProgramCounter = InterruptPointer;
  }
  switch (ReadMemory(ProgramCounter++)) {
    /*
     * Handling of every valid instruction
     * goes here...
     */
    default:
    Interrupt = INT_ILLEGAL;
  }
}

Interpreters are very popular as computer simulators, as they are much simpler to implement than more time-efficient alternative solutions, and their speed is more than adequate for emulating computers of more than roughly a decade ago on modern machines. However, the speed penalty inherent in interpretation can be a problem when emulating computers whose processor speed is on the same order of magnitude as the host machine. Until not many years ago, emulation in such situations was considered completely impractical by many. However, see § Comparison with simulation.

What allowed breaking through this restriction were the advances in dynamic recompilation techniques. Simple a priori translation of emulated program code into code runnable on the host architecture is usually impossible because of several reasons:

- code may be modified while in RAM, even if it is modified only by the emulated operating system when loading the code (for example from disk)
- there may not be a way to reliably distinguish data (which should not be translated) from executable code.

Various forms of dynamic recompilation, including the popular Just In Time compiler (JIT) technique, try to circumvent these problems by waiting until the processor control flow jumps into a location containing untranslated code, and only then ("just in time") translates a block of the code into host code that can be executed. The translated code is kept in a code cache, and the original code is not lost or affected; this way, even data segments can be (meaninglessly) translated by the recompiler, resulting in no more than a waste of translation time. Speed may not be desirable as some older games were not designed with the speed of faster computers in mind. A game designed for a 30 MHz PC with a level timer of 300 game seconds might only give the player 30 seconds on a 300 MHz PC. Other programs, such as some DOS programs, may not even run on faster computers. Particularly when emulating computers which were "closed-box", in which changes to the core of the system were not typical, software may use techniques that depend on specific characteristics of the computer it ran on (e.g. its CPU's speed) and thus precise control of the speed of emulation is important for such applications to be properly emulated.

=== Input/output (I/O) ===
Most emulators do not, as mentioned earlier, emulate the main system bus; each I/O device is thus often treated as a special case, and no consistent interface for virtual peripherals is provided. This can result in a performance advantage, since each I/O module can be tailored to the characteristics of the emulated device; designs based on a standard, unified I/O API can, however, rival such simpler models, if well thought-out, and they have the additional advantage of "automatically" providing a plug-in service through which third-party virtual devices can be used within the emulator. A unified I/O API may not necessarily mirror the structure of the real hardware bus: bus design is limited by several electric constraints and a need for hardware concurrency management that can mostly be ignored in a software implementation.

Even in emulators that treat each device as a special case, there is usually a common basic infrastructure for:

- managing interrupts, by means of a procedure that sets flags readable by the CPU simulator whenever an interrupt is raised, allowing the virtual CPU to "poll for (virtual) interrupts"
- writing to and reading from physical memory, by means of two procedures similar to the ones dealing with logical memory (although, unlike the latter, the former can often be left out, and direct references to the memory array be employed instead)

== Applications ==
=== In preservation ===
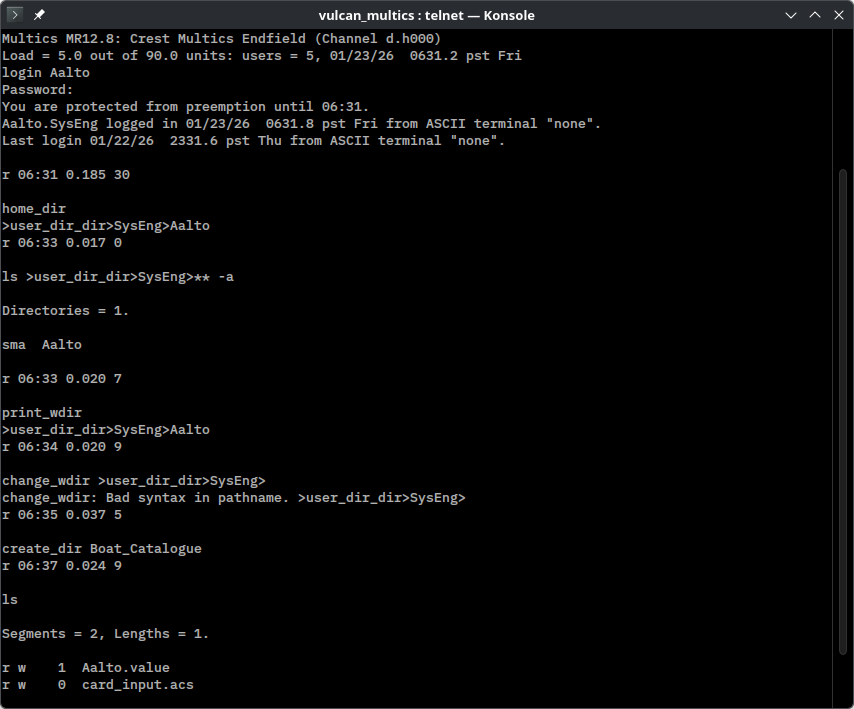
DPS8M Simulator running Multics on Linux

Emulation is one strategy in pursuit of digital preservation and combating obsolescence. Emulation focuses on recreating an original computer environment, which can be time-consuming and difficult to achieve, but valuable because of its ability to maintain a closer connection to the authenticity of the digital object, operating system, or even gaming platform. Emulation addresses the original hardware and software environment of the digital object, and recreates it on a current machine. The emulator allows the user to have access to any kind of application or operating system on a current platform, while the software runs as it did in its original environment. Jeffery Rothenberg, an early proponent of emulation as a digital preservation strategy states, "the ideal approach would provide a single extensible, long-term solution that can be designed once and for all and applied uniformly, automatically, and in organized synchrony (for example, at every refresh cycle) to all types of documents and media". He further states that this should not only apply to out of date systems, but also be upwardly mobile to future unknown systems. Practically speaking, when a certain application is released in a new version, rather than address compatibility issues and migration for every digital object created in the previous version of that application, one could create an emulator for the application, allowing access to all of said digital objects.

=== In new media art ===
Because of its primary use of digital formats, new media art relies heavily on emulation as a preservation strategy. Artists such as Cory Arcangel specialize in resurrecting obsolete technologies in their artwork and recognize the importance of a decentralized and deinstitutionalized process for the preservation of digital culture. In many cases, the goal of emulation in new media art is to preserve a digital medium so that it can be saved indefinitely and reproduced without error, so that there is no reliance on hardware that ages and becomes obsolete. The paradox is that the emulation and the emulator have to be made to work on future computers.

=== In future systems design ===
Emulation techniques are commonly used during the design and development of new systems. It eases the development process by providing the ability to detect, recreate and repair flaws in the design even before the system is actually built. It is particularly useful in the design of multi-core systems, where concurrency errors can be very difficult to detect and correct without the controlled environment provided by virtual hardware. This also allows the software development to take place before the hardware is ready, thus helping to validate design decisions and give a little more control.

== Comparison with simulation ==
The word "emulator" was coined in 1963 at IBM during development of the NPL (IBM System/360) product line, using a "new combination of software, microcode, and hardware". They discovered that simulation using additional instructions implemented in microcode and hardware, instead of software simulation using only standard instructions, to execute programs written for earlier IBM computers dramatically increased simulation speed. Earlier, IBM provided simulators for, e.g., the 650 on the 705. In addition to simulators, IBM had compatibility features on the 709 and 7090, for which it provided the IBM 709 computer with a program to run legacy programs written for the IBM 704 on the 709 and later on the IBM 7090. This program used the instructions added by the compatibility feature to trap instructions requiring special handling; all other 704 instructions ran the same on a 7090. The compatibility feature on the 1410 only required setting a console toggle switch, not a support program.

In 1963, when microcode was first used to speed up this simulation process, IBM engineers coined the term "emulator" to describe the concept. In the 2000s, it has become common to use the word "emulate" in the context of software. However, before 1980, "emulation" referred only to emulation with a hardware or microcode assist, while "simulation" referred to pure software emulation. For example, a computer specially built for running programs designed for another architecture is an emulator. In contrast, a simulator could be a program which runs on a PC, so that old Atari games can be simulated on it. Purists continue to insist on this distinction, but currently the term "emulation" often means the complete imitation of a machine executing binary code while "simulation" often refers to computer simulation, where a computer program is used to simulate an abstract model. Computer simulation is used in virtually every scientific and engineering domain and Computer Science is no exception, with several projects simulating abstract models of computer systems, such as network simulation, which both practically and semantically differs from network emulation.

== Comparison with hardware virtualization ==
Hardware virtualization is the virtualization of computers as complete hardware platforms, certain logical abstractions of their components, or only the functionality required to run various operating systems. Virtualization hides the physical characteristics of a computing platform from the users, presenting instead an abstract computing platform. At its origins, the software that controlled virtualization was called a "control program", but the terms "hypervisor" or "virtual machine monitor" became preferred over time. Each hypervisor can manage or run multiple virtual machines.

== See also ==
- List of emulators
  - List of computer system emulators
  - QEMU
  - Q (emulator)
