= NESticle =

Nintendo Entertainment System emulator

- Version x.xx
- Original author: Icer Addis
- Developer: Bloodlust Software
Final release
- DOS: x.xx / 18 August 1998; 28 years ago
- Windows 95: 0.4.2 / 22 September 1997; 29 years ago
- Operating system: Windows 95, MS-DOS
- Type: Emulator
- License: Proprietary; Freeware
- Website: bloodlust.zophar.net/NESticle/nes.html at the Wayback Machine (archived 2016-11-16)

NESticle is a Nintendo Entertainment System emulator, which was written by Icer Addis of Bloodlust Software. Released on April 3, 1997, the widely popular program originally ran under MS-DOS and Windows 95. It was the first freeware NES emulator, and became commonly considered the NES emulator of choice for the 1990s. Initially offering few features and only supporting a handful of games, development proceeded rapidly and to expand usability such that NESticle is today credited with introducing the concept of recordable playthrough for emulation, as well as providing the capacity for users to create their own graphical hacks via an integrated graphics editor. In pioneering this heightened level of access for users, and providing the tools for fans to hack and remix familiar classics, NESticle has been credited by Spin as representing a milestone toward the development of video game music as a genre.

While the emulator is no longer updated and has become obsolete as other emulation projects have developed and improved, NESticle remains frequently listed among prominent top tier emulators and it is still regarded as a good choice for emulation on older (486 and earlier) computers.

In January 2022, the source code for a Super NES version of the emulator, SNESticle, was released by Addis after a programmer attempted to reverse-engineer the code, which had been released in a GameCube game, Fight Night Round 2. In February of that same year, Addis began work on a follow-up to NESticle, an experimental macOS-based application based on transistor-level simulation of the NES chipset, called metalnes.

== Development ==
NESticle offered its initial release as NESticle v0.2 on April 3, 1997. Its name is a portmanteau of "NES" (the console it emulates) and "testicle". The program originally ran under MS-DOS and Windows 95, offering few features and only supporting a handful of games. It was one of the first freeware NES emulators, and soon became more popular than shareware rivals such as iNES.

NESticle was coded in C++ and assembly using Microsoft Visual C++ 4.10. Part of the emulator's appeal was performance: its system requirements capped at around 25MHz enabling it to run on modest Pentium and 486 DX2 PCs. Its GUI was colorful and easy to use, featuring numerous utilities that allowed user to view, edit, and save custom graphics, palettes, and the like. Within two months of its April release, NESticle could take screenshots mid-game, pause and resume progress at any point using save states, edit in-game palettes and graphics, play games online, save audio output, and record and playback gameplay movies. NESticle, as its name implied, also had a dash of lowbrow and morbid humor. The mouse pointer, for instance, was skinned with a bloody, dismembered left hand extending its pointer finger.

The source code for NESticle was illegally copied from Addis's computer by a code cracker who accessed its network shares with Samba. Because of the incident, Addis decided to discontinue NESticle. August 1998 saw the final NESticle release, version x.xx, and support for the emulator was discontinued. This version featured noticeably improved emulation, especially audio emulation (the triangle wave was correctly 4-bit quantized, the 50% pulse wave had the correct duty cycle and the noise was corrected). It was also MS-DOS only. NESticle eventually became obsolete as other emulation projects continued to develop and improve. Nevertheless, it continues to be noted years after its obsolescence for its speed, particularly on lower-end computers.

== Influence ==
As one of the more popular early emulators, NESticle's influence on the emulation scene has been far-reaching. Its innovative development of 'NES movie' playthrough recording, and its use as a tool for homebrew graphical hacks enabled it to influence the development of even tangentially related fields such as the video game music genre, and console case modding. The emulator has been noted as an influence in the gaming backgrounds of video game collectors like Pat Contri (known as "Pat the NES Punk"), Destructoid's Samit Sarkar, and indie video game musicians, The NESkimos.

== See also ==
- List of NES emulators
