= EPSXe =

PlayStation emulator

ePSXe
- EPSXe's logo

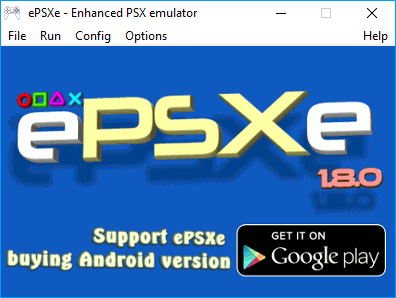
- ePSXe 1.8.0 Running on MS Windows 10
- Original authors: calb, _Demo_, Galtor
- Developer: ePSXe Software S.L.
- Release: October 14, 2000; 25 years ago
- Stable release: 2.0.18 (PC) / 2.0.15 (Android) / December 23, 2025; 8 months ago (PC) / June 19, 2021; 5 years ago (Android)
- Operating system: Microsoft Windows, Linux, Android, macOS
- Available in: Multilingual
- Type: Video game console emulator
- License: Proprietary
- Website: www.epsxe.com

ePSXe (enhanced PSX emulator) is a PlayStation video game console emulator for x86-based PC hardware with Microsoft Windows and Linux, as well as devices running Android. It was written by three authors, using the aliases calb, _Demo_ and Galtor. ePSXe is closed source with the exception of the application programming interface (API) for its plug-ins.

== Development ==
For half a year, ePSXe was developed in private, with part of this initial development being carried out by _Demo_, previously known for his work on the Super Nintendo emulator ZSNES. When released on October 14, 2000, ePSXe was a revolution in the PlayStation emulation scene, boasting higher compatibility and performance than other emulators of the system at the time.

After ePSXe 1.6.0 was released on August 5, 2003, its development seemed to halt, with speculation that the source code had been lost due to a hard disk failure. However, on April 5, 2008, the developers of ePSXe made a public statement revealing that in the summer of 2007, they had decided to continue development of the emulator, due to encouragement from users. On May 24, 2008, ePSXe version 1.7.0 was released.

After another hiatus, the developers came back on August 30, 2012, announcing the release of ePSXe for Android, as well as stating that ePSXe for Windows was in testing of version 1.8.0. This version was released on November 9, 2012., being followed by 1.9.0 in 2013 and ePSXe 1.9.25 in 2015.

== Features ==
ePSXe was one of the early emulators to make use of plug-ins to emulate GPU, SPU (sound), and CD-ROM drive functions, a model first established in PSEmu Pro. Games can be loaded from the computer's CD drive or from one of many types of CD images directly from the user's hard drive.

A patching feature allows the user to apply game patches. Games that do not necessarily run properly, or even start at all, can be fixed and played via the use of ePSXe patch files in .ppf format. Not all games prone to bugs have ppf patches written for them.

Until version 1.9.25, ePSXe could only function with an image of an official Sony PlayStation BIOS. Since the various PlayStation BIOS images are copyrighted by Sony, it is illegal to distribute them. For this reason, ePSXe does not come bundled with any of the PlayStation BIOS images, requiring the user to provide one for the emulator. Version 1.9.25 added HLE BIOS support, allowing it to mimic the effect of the PlayStation's BIOS, although compatibility is currently lower than an official BIOS.

=== Plug-ins ===
- GPU: Most GPU plug-ins run with either Direct3D, OpenGL, or the Glide API, and are available as freeware or open-source. Many GPU plugins require game-specific hacks to run games.
- SPU: The SPU plug-ins can emulate everything from music to sound effects, with varying degrees of success depending on the plug-in settings, and of course the plug-in being used
- CD-ROM: ePSXe comes with a core CD-ROM plug-in, but many others are available for freeware download and many can emulate up to seven different types of read modes
- Input: The core plug-in is sufficient, but there are others that allow for more functionality.

=== Compatibility ===
ePSXe is able to run most PlayStation games somewhat accurately. Few games run flawlessly without extensive configuration and trial by error testing. In the case that a game does not run successfully, patches written for the game in question can be used, though few games have patches available.

== Reception ==
In 2003, Indian technology website TechTree.com stated that "ePSXe is the best free PlayStation emulator", and in 2005, Retro Gamer called ePSXe "the best free PlayStation emulator". In 2023, MakeUseOf said that while both ePSXe and PCSX (another PlayStation emulator) provide easy access to PlayStation emulation, they "could be better", ultimately calling DuckStation the better option.

== See also ==
- Mednafen
- bleem!
- PCSX
- List of video game emulators
