= Web User =

British technology magazine

- The cover of the final issue of Web User, issue 516, published on 9 December 2020.
- Editor: Robert Irvine
- Categories: Computers
- Frequency: Fortnightly
- Circulation: ▼24,266 (January – December 2019)
- Publisher: John Garewal
- First issue: 22 March 2001
- Final issue: 9 December 2020
- Company: Dennis Publishing
- Country: England
- Based in: London
- Language: English
- Website: www.webuser.co.uk
- ISSN: 1473-7094

Web User, branded as WebUser, was a fortnightly magazine published in the United Kingdom from 2001 until 2020. It covered topics relating to computing. Its sister magazine was ComputerActive.

== Overview ==
Web User was founded by IPC Media in 2001. The first issue appeared on 22 March. The bulk of the magazine's content consisted of internet news, website reviews and features on web-related topics. Additionally, it offered product evaluations, free apps and software, step-by-step workshops, and advice on how to use websites, computer hardware, and software. The magazine was complemented by a website, launched in tandem in 2001. It was sold in 2010 to Dennis Publishing. It ceased publication after 516 issues in December 2020.

Topics covered include free software; PC security and maintenance; browser add-ons; the best Google tools; and the latest web trends and developments, such as Web 2.0 and social networking.
