= Wzonka-Lad =

Nintendo Game Boy emulator for Amiga

- Original author: Ville Helin
- Initial release: 1996; 30 years ago
- Stable release: v1.03 GPL / 3 January 2004; 22 years ago
- Written in: 68020 assembler
- Platform: Amiga
- License: GPL V2
- Website: www.villehelin.com/wzonka-lad.html

Wzonka-Lad is a Nintendo Game Boy emulator for the Amiga series of home computers.

== History ==
Wzonka-Lad was written by Ville Helin in 68020 assembler. Development began in 1996 and continued through 1999. The project was started because existing Game Boy emulators for Amiga, such as Virtual Game Boy (VGB), which was written in C, ran too slowly on Amiga hardware. Helin wrote Wzonka-Lad in assembly language to improve performance.

Wzonka-Lad was originally released as shareware, with registration required to unlock audio support. In August 2003, it was re-licensed as free software under the GNU General Public License, and the source code was made publicly available.

== Features ==
Wzonka-Lad is written entirely in assembly language, offering a graphical user interface and a range of features despite its low-level implementation. The emulator requires at least a Motorola 68020 processor and provides several options to vary game speed and colors. It supports graphics and sound cards via CyberGraphX and AHI, and can run on the Amiga Workbench.

== Performance and compatibility ==
Compared to other Amiga Game Boy emulators, early versions of Wzonka-Lad (such as 0.64) were slower but more compatible than AmigaGameBoy, and faster than Unix ports like VGB. Later versions, such as 0.99, achieved playable speeds for most games on systems with a 68030 50 MHz processor or higher. The emulator offers several executables, including "Full", "Fast", and "Warp" versions. The "Fast" version uses simplified Z80 emulation for better speed, while "Warp" reduces interrupt processing for maximum performance. The "Full" version is the slowest but most compatible.
