= Nestopia =

Nintendo Entertainment System emulator

Nestopia UE
- Developer: 0ldsk00l
- Release: January 22, 2013; 13 years ago
- Stable release: 2.0.0 / September 13, 2026; 10 days ago
- Written in: C++
- Operating system: Linux, BSD, Mac OS X, Microsoft Windows
- Type: Emulator
- License: GPLv2
- Website: 0ldsk00l.ca/nestopia/
- Repository: github.com/0ldsk00l/nestopia

Nestopia
- Developer: Martin Freij
- Release: June 14, 2003; 23 years ago
- Final release: 1.40 / July 11, 2008; 18 years ago
- Written in: C++
- Operating system: Linux, Mac OS X, Microsoft Windows
- Type: Emulator
- License: GPLv2
- Website: nestopia.sourceforge.net
- Repository: sourceforge.net/projects/nestopia/files

Nestopia UE - and its predecessor Nestopia - are open-source emulators designed to emulate the NES/Famicom hardware as accurately as possible.

== Features ==
The requirements for the original Nestopia were considered higher than some of its contemporaries such as Stella. To run an optimal emulation, the program requires a minimum 800 MHz processor. Its high requirement is due to its accurate emulation of the NES hardware. The emulator will play most ROMs and has a strong port for the Apple Macintosh.

The original Nestopia allowed customization of colors, sounds, and graphics. It includes special features such as Power Glove. Brandon Widdler of Digital Trends considers the emulator one of the best for the NES, though he admits that it has fewer features than its rival FCEUX.

== Development history ==
Nestopia was originally developed for Windows by Martin Freij. Richard Bannister and R. Belmont later ported it to Mac OS X and Linux, respectively. Original development ended in 2008, but forked into Nestopia UE.

== See also ==
- List of NES emulators
- List of Nintendo Entertainment System games
