= Higan (emulator) =

Multi-system emulator

higan

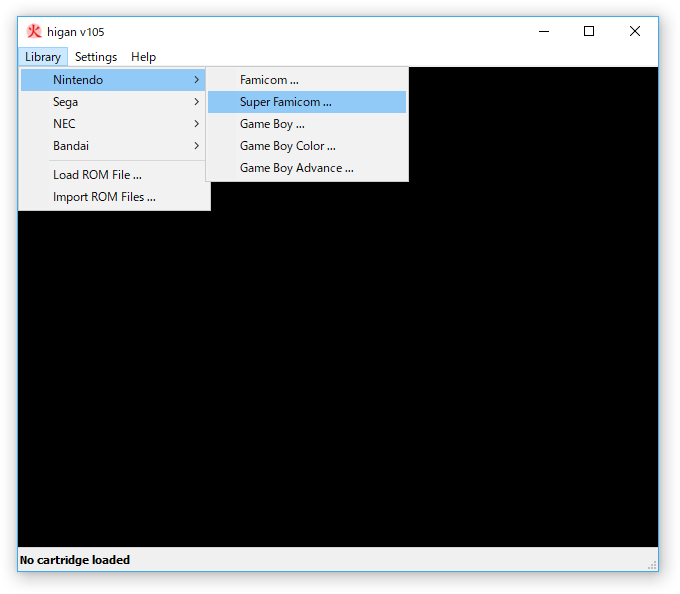
- higan v105 running on Windows 10
- Developer: Near et al.
- Release: October 14, 2004; 21 years ago
- Stable release: 115 / August 15, 2020; 6 years ago
- Written in: C++14, C99
- Operating system: Windows, Linux, macOS, FreeBSD
- Platform: Independent: IA-32, x86-64, ARM32/64, MIPS, etc.
- Type: Video game console emulator
- License: 2020: GPL-3.0-or-later; 2017: GPL-3.0-only
- Website: github.com/higan-emu/higan; Derivatives: github.com/bsnes-emu/bsnes; ares-emu.net
- Repository: github.com/higan-emu/higan

Higan is a free and open source emulator for multiple video game consoles, including the Super Nintendo Entertainment System. It was developed by Near. Originally called bsnes (which was later reused for a new emulator by the same developer), the emulator is notable for attempting to emulate the original hardware as accurately as possible through low-level, cycle-accurate emulation and for the associated historical preservation efforts of the Super NES platform.

== Overview ==
Development of the emulator began with the name bsnes on October 14, 2004. The first version was released in May 2005 for Microsoft Windows. The early versions would require high-power hardware to run games in a consistent manner and therefore garnered controversy. Since then, it has been ported to Linux, macOS, and FreeBSD. Initially developed under a custom license, later releases were licensed under various versions of the GNU General Public License. On August 9, 2012, the project was renamed to higan, to better reflect its new nature as a multi-system emulator. It was named after a Japanese Buddhist holiday.

The higan project has contributed significantly to the field of Super NES emulation, with a number of original achievements in its emulation, and in reverse engineering developments such as the organization of funds, hardware, and expertise for decapping the Super NES's enhancement chips.

Higan is able to run every commercial Super NES title ever released. It is the first emulator to have featured SPC7110 emulation, cycle-accurate SPC 700 emulation, cycle-accurate Super FX emulation, Super Game Boy emulation, and a dot-based instead of scanline-based renderer for the Game Boy Advance. It is the first multi-emulator of this breadth to achieve cycle-based emulation for every single component of every system.

Forked versions of bsnes have provided emulation support for Nintendo DS, XBAND, Super Famicom Box, Satellaview BS-X software, and tool-assisted speedruns.

=== higan products family ===
Higan has been forked and renamed over the years, and consists of three sub-projects. The current sub-projects are:

- bsnes: A Super NES emulator with Super Game Boy support.
- higan: A multi-system emulator that focuses on accuracy. Supported systems include the NES, Super NES, Game Boy (Color), Game Boy Advance, SG-1000 and SC-3000, Master System, Game Gear, Genesis, Sega CD, PC Engine (SuperGrafx), MSX and MSX2, ColecoVision, WonderSwan (Color), and Neo Geo Pocket (Color).
- ares: A multi-system emulator that is a fork of higan, focusing on performance and adding experimental PlayStation and Nintendo 64 support in addition to the systems supported in higan.

== Author ==
Higan was developed by American software engineer David Kirk Ginder, known as Near and formerly as byuu. Near started out in the emulation scene as an amateur programmer, translating Japanese video-game ROM images in 1998, at the age of 14, and one year later developed a tool for displaying resized text font in games. A patching assembler called "xkas" followed, which streamlined the ROM-translation process. The development of bsnes was triggered by bugs during translation of Super Famicom game Der Langrisser that would only appear on the original hardware but not on 2004-era Super NES emulators; as such, the aim of bsnes was for accurate emulation. Near died in 2021.

== Reception ==
In 2008, British Internet magazine Webuser recommended bsnes for "some fun old-school gaming". In 2009, Japanese game magazine GameLabo recommended it for "those seeking a realistic playing experience".

In 2017, components of higan's source code were used to emulate the vintage text-to-speech computer used by physicist Stephen Hawking, after the original hardware began showing signs of wear. Hawking would continue using this emulator to converse with others until his death in 2018.

== See also ==
- List of Super NES emulators
