= VisualBoyAdvance =

Emulator for the Game Boy handheld game consoles

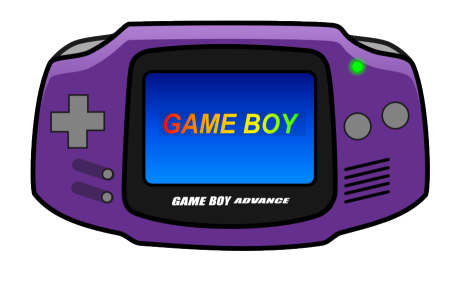
- Original author: Forgotten (alias)
- Developer: VBA Team
- Stable release: 1.7.2 (Windows); 1.7.1 (Linux, BeOS); 1.7.4 (Mac) / May 25, 2004; 21 years ago
- Preview release: 1.8.0 beta 3 / October 1, 2005; 20 years ago
- Written in: C, C++
- Operating system: Cross-platform
- Size: 1.4 MB – 1.92 MB
- Available in: English, French, German, Italian, Polish, Portuguese, Chinese, Spanish, Turkish (v.1.7 and above, for Windows only)
- Type: Console emulator
- License: GPL-2.0-or-later
- Repository: sourceforge.net/projects/vba/

VisualBoyAdvance-M
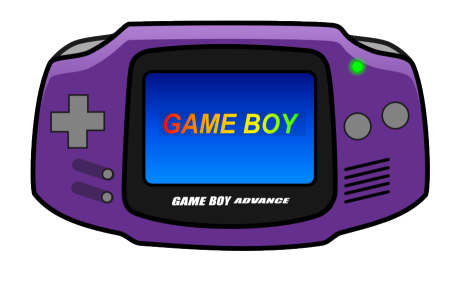
- Original author: Forgotten et al.
- Developer: VBA-M Development Team
- Stable release: 2.2.3 / 25 October 2025; 6 months ago
- Operating system: Cross-platform
- Type: Console emulator
- License: GPL-3.0
- Website: https://www.visualboyadvance-m.org
- Repository: github.com/visualboyadvance-m/visualboyadvance-m

VisualBoyAdvance (commonly abbreviated as VBA) is a free emulator of the Game Boy, Game Boy Color, and Game Boy Advance handheld game consoles as well as of Super Game Boy and Super Game Boy 2.

Besides the DirectX version for the Windows platform, there is also one that is based on the free platform independent graphics library SDL. This is available for a variety of operating systems including Linux, BSD, Mac OS X, and BeOS. VisualBoyAdvance has also been ported to AmigaOS 4, AROS, GameCube, Wii, webOS, and Zune HD.

== History ==
The VisualBoyAdvance project was started by a developer under the online alias "Forgotten". When this person left the development of the emulator, the project was handed over to a team named "VBA Team", led by Forgotten's brother. Development on the original VisualBoyAdvance stopped in 2004 with version 1.8.0 beta 3, and a number of forked versions were made by various developers in the years since then, such as VisualBoyAdvance-M.

VBA was a crucial component of Twitch Plays Pokémon, a social experiment in which thousands of button inputs collected from the viewership of the streaming website Twitch were fed into an emulated version of Pokémon Red. Viewers typed commands into the chat function, which was then fed into the VBA emulator via an IRC bot. They succeeded after 16 days of continuous play, with a peak concurrent viewership of 121,000 and over 1.1 million unique participants.

== VisualBoyAdvance-M ==
VisualBoyAdvance-M, or simply VBA-M, is an improved fork from the inactive VisualBoyAdvance project, adding several features as well as maintaining an up-to-date codebase. After VisualBoyAdvance became inactive in 2004, several forks began to appear such as VBALink, which allowed users to emulate the linking of two Game Boy devices. Eventually, VBA-M was created, which merged several of the forks into one codebase. Thus, the M in VBA-M stands for Merge. VBA-M is backwards compatible with Game Boy and Game Boy Color.

VBA-M's GBA emulation core was ported into RetroArch/Libretro, without the GB, GBC and SGB cores. as well as a modified version called VBA-Next.

VBA-GX is a port of VBA-M to Wii. It enables motion controls for emulated Game Boy Advance games.

== Reception ==
The VisualBoyAdvance became the most popular GBA emulator for the Unix platform and the emulator contributed "greatly" to the late years of GBA game development by providing a suite of development and visual debugging tools for developers who wanted to create games that surpassed even Nintendo's own. A port from VBA's code was used as the foundation of the Visual Boy Zune, an emulator of the Zune HD.

Wesley Akkerman from the Dutch computer magazine Computer!Totaal named the VisualBoyAdvance as one of the best Game Boy emulators alongside the mGBA, owing to its variety of features and customization options. In a review on the tech blog Techilife, VisualBoyAdvance has been named the oldest and most reliable Game Boy Advance emulator and has been praised for its ease of use.

== Features ==
VisualBoyAdvance has many features that would require more work to do on the actual GBA. VisualBoyAdvance supports Fullscreen support, can take advantage of cheat codes from Gameshark and Action Replay, and can take screenshots while playing the game. Many players would also like to find the ability to customize graphics for a better performance than what was possible on the GBA.

== See also ==
- List of video game emulators
