= FCEUX =

Emulator for Nintendo Entertainment System and Famicom Disk System

- FCEUX icon
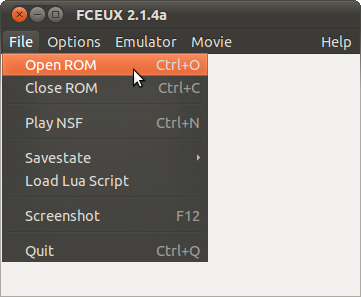
- Opening a ROM file in FCEUX in Ubuntu
- Release: August 2, 2008; 18 years ago
- Stable release: 2.7.0 / October 14, 2026; 3 days ago
- Preview release: Interim Build / November 10, 2025; 11 months ago
- Written in: C++
- Operating system: Cross-platform
- Type: Emulator
- License: GPL-2.0-or-later
- Website: fceux.com/web/home.html
- Repository: github.com/TASEmulators/fceux

FCEUX is an open-source Nintendo Entertainment System and Family Computer Disk System emulator. It is a merger of various forks of FCE Ultra.

== Ports ==
An integrated GTK2 GUI was added to the SDL port of FCEUX in version 2.1.3. This GTK GUI deprecated the previous python frontend, gfceux.

As of version 2.3.0, the SDL port migrated from GTK2 to a cross platform Qt5 GUI front end. The 2.4.0 version was the first release in which the SDL port is runnable on Windows, Linux, and macOS operating systems.

It has been ported to DOS, Linux (with either SVGAlib or X), macOS (its SDL port should also work on other Unix-like platforms such as FreeBSD, Solaris and IRIX), Windows, GP2X, PlayStation Portable, the Nintendo GameCube, Wii, PlayStation 2 and Pepper Pad.

== Multiplayer support ==
Experimental basic netplay was only added in late 2026 at v2.7.0. Until then, for almost two decades the Win32 and SDL versions didn't support TCP/IP network play functionality, as they do not support controllers.

== History ==
FCE Ultra was forked from FCE (Family Computer Emulator). Its last full release was version 0.98.12 in August 2004, while a pre-release version 0.98.13-pre was released in September 2004 as source code only. After that, development appeared to stop and the homepage and forums for the emulator were taken down.

In the absence of official development, many forks of FCE Ultra were created. Most notable are FCEU-MM, which supports many new and unusual mappers, FCEU Rerecording, which incorporates many useful features for tool-assisted speedruns, and FCEUXD SP, which adds a number of debugging utilities.

In March 2006 it was reactivated and shortly thereafter a project was initiated to combine all the forks into one new application called FCEUX, which attracted collaboration from many authors of the various forks of FCE Ultra.

FCEUX was first publicly released on August 2, 2008. This fork of the emulator has continued steady development since then, allowing the other forks to become deprecated, and now has features the original FCE Ultra does not, such as native movie recording support and the ability to extend, enhance, or alter gameplay with Lua scripts. Thus it has become far more advanced than its predecessors.

== Contributors ==
FCE was written by Bero. FCE Ultra was written by Xodnizel. It was reactivated by Anthony Giorgio and Mark Doliner. The FCEUX project was initiated by Zeromus and Sebastian Porst. Additional authors joined the group prior to its first release, including mz, adelikat, nitsujrehtona, maximus, CaH4e3, qFox and Lukas Sabota (punkrockguy318). Other contributors have included Aaron O'Neal, Joe Nahmias, Paul Kuliniewicz, Quietust, Parasyte, bbitmaster, blip, nitsuja, Luke Gustafson, UncombedCoconut, Jay Lanagan, Acmlm, DWEdit, Soules, radsaq, qeed, Shinydoofy, ugetab and Ugly Joe.

== Reception ==
Brandon Widdler of Digital Trends considers FCEUX the go to emulator for the NES because of its multiple advanced features including debugging, ROM hacking, and video recording.

== See also ==
- List of NES emulators
