= Snes9x =

Emulator for the SNES video game console

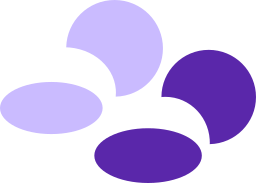

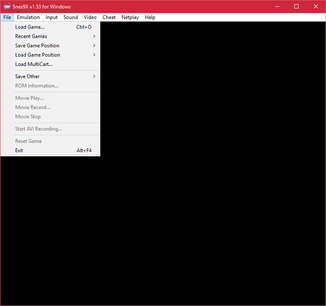
- Snes9x 1.53 on Windows 10
- Original authors: Gary Henderson, Jerremy Koot
- Developer: Snes9x Team
- Release: August 22, 1997; 29 years ago
- Stable release: 1.63 / July 10, 2024; 2 years ago
- Written in: C++
- Operating system: Cross-platform
- Type: Video game console emulator
- License: Proprietary, redistributable with non-commercial usage clause
- Website: www.snes9x.com
- Repository: github.com/snes9xgit/snes9x

Snes9x is a Super Nintendo Entertainment System emulator software with official ports for MS-DOS, Linux, Microsoft Windows, AmigaOS 4, macOS, MorphOS, Xbox, PSP, PS3, GameCube, Wii, iOS, and Android. Windows RT and Windows Phone 8 have an unofficial port named Snes8x.

== Background ==
Development of Snes9x began in July 1997 when Gary Henderson's Snes96 and Jerremy Koot's Snes97 emulators merged to create Snes9x. Snes9x was among the first to emulate most SNES enhancement chips at some level. In version 1.53, it added support for Cg shaders. Version 1.55 added support for the MSU1 enhancement chip found on the SD2SNES

The emulator PocketSNES for Pocket PCs is based on Snes9X.

There is also an unofficial Snes9x port compiled with Emscripten which runs inside a web browser.

== License ==
The source code of Snes9x is publicly available, but the license prohibits its commercial use.

== Reception ==
In 2005, Retro Gamer called Snes9x "the best SNES emulator available".

In 2021, Digital Trends noted that the emulator had broad compatibility and ran on systems with limited resources.

== See also ==
- List of SNES emulators
