= Stella (emulator) =

Atari 2600 emulator

- Stella icon
- Developers: Bradford W. Mott, Stephen Anthony; Stella Team
- Initial release: 16 May 1996; 30 years ago
- Stable release: 7.0 / 5 October 2024; 19 months ago
- Written in: C++20
- Operating system: Current: Linux, MacOS, Windows No longer supported: AmigaOS, Dreamcast, GP2X, Nintendo DS, Wii, Windows CE/Mobile
- Type: Console emulator
- License: GNU GPLv2, open-source
- Website: stella-emu.github.io
- Repository: github.com/stella-emu/stella

Stella is an emulator of the Atari 2600 game console, and takes its name from the console's codename. It is open-source, and runs on most major modern platforms including Windows, Mac OS X, and Linux. Stella started development in late 1995 and was first released in May 1996 (originally under the name Stella 96) by Bradford W. Mott; it is now maintained by Stephen Anthony.

Stella is written in the C++ programming language and thus is highly portable. The emulator supports all Atari 2600 cartridge bank switching schemes and has support for nearly all Atari 2600 titles. Support is included for NTSC, PAL and SECAM in 60/50 Hz varieties, including autodetection of those formats (based on the number of scanlines generated in each frame). It has cycle-exact emulation for the TIA chip (graphics and sound); the Stella Team estimates that current TIA emulation is nearing 100% completion.

Stella emulates most Atari 2600 peripheral devices, including standard joysticks, paddle controllers, the Atari Video Touch Pad, the Atari Keyboard Controller, Atari Indy 500 Driving Controllers, the CBS Booster-Grip controller, the Atari TrakBall/AtariMouse/AmigaMouse trackball controllers, the Sega Genesis controller, and the AtariVox and SaveKey controllers. Stelladaptor and 2600-daptor support allows real joysticks, paddles, and driving controllers to be used, and support is also included to access a real AtariVox device plugged into a serial port (and actually generate sound from the AtariVox device). Stella does not yet support the cassette-based titles designed to work with the Coleco KidVid cassette player but does have support for titles designed to work with the Starpath Supercharger and Spectravideo Compumate.

Stella includes many facilities for homebrew developers, including an extensive built-in interactive debugger and disassembler supporting breakpoints, read/write traps, etc. Other major features include Blargg TV effects, a cheatcode system, support for user-defined palette files, state loading/saving (including a TimeMachine-like unwind/rewind capability), hardware-accelerated rendering and effects, event remapping, and an extensive built-in, cross-platform user interface (including a ROM launcher frontend).

Stella uses the TIA emulation core from 6502.ts, a collection of emulators for MOS 6502 based systems written in TypeScript and runnable from a web page.
