= PPSSPP =

PSP emulator

- PPSSPP logo

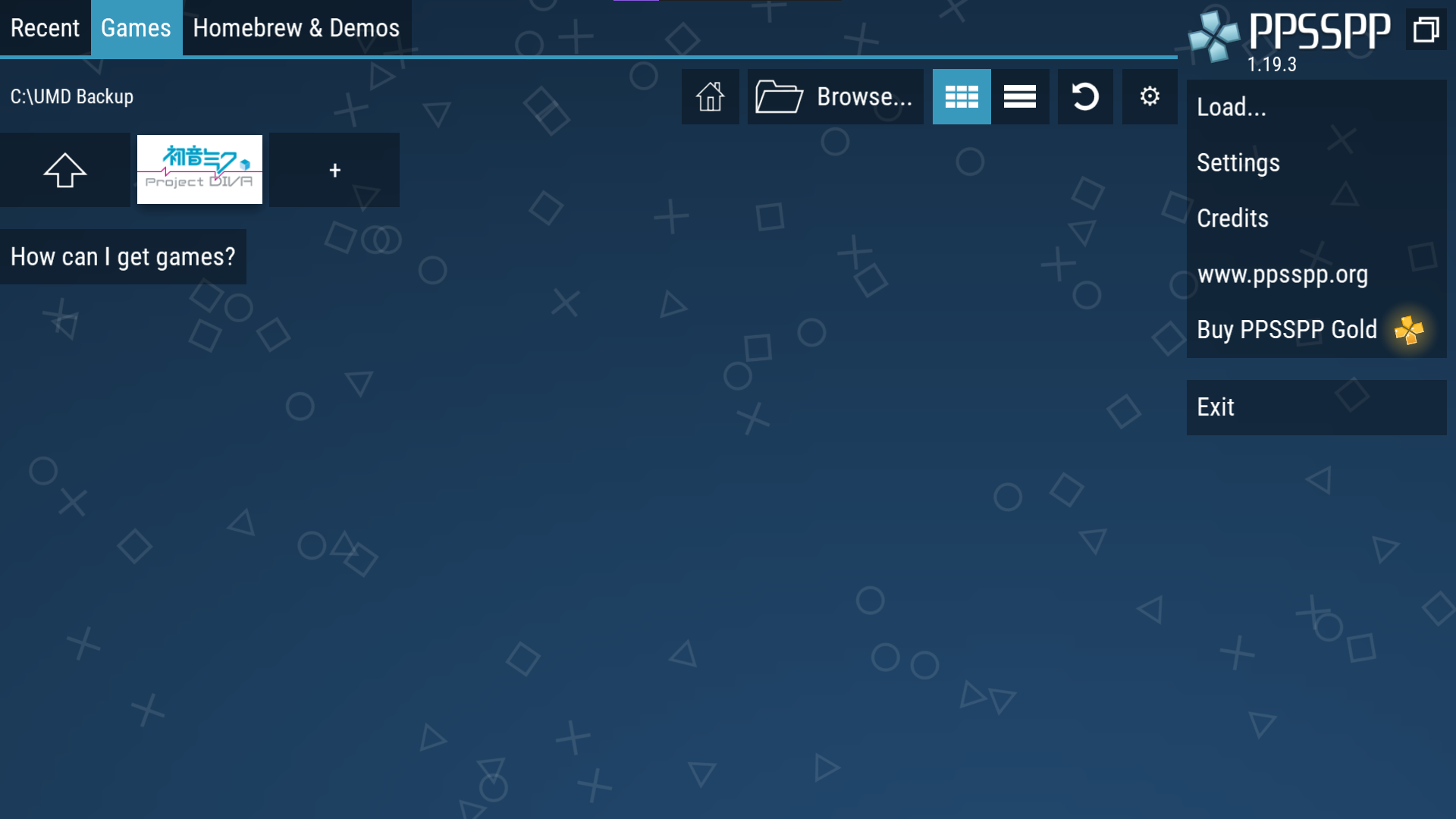
- PPSSPP v1.19.3 running on Windows 10
- Original author: Henrik Rydgård (a.k.a. hrydgard)
- Developer: PPSSPP Team
- Release: November 1, 2012; 13 years ago
- Stable release: 1.20.4 / May 16, 2026; 5 months ago
- Written in: C++, C
- Operating system: Windows, macOS, Linux, Xbox Series X/S, iOS, Android, BlackBerry 10, Symbian, Pandora, Wii U
- Platform: IA-32, x86-64, ARM, ARM64
- Size: 16.1 MB: Windows 32-bit 18.1 MB: Windows 64-bit 19.7 MB: macOS 64-bit 28.2 MB: Android; 10.0 MB: BlackBerry 10; 9.2 MB: Symbian; 44.7 MB: Source code 41.2 MB: iOS
- Available in: 38 languages: English, Arabic, Brazilian Portuguese, Bulgarian, Chinese (simplified and traditional), Czech, Danish, Dutch, Finnish, French, German, Greek, Hebrew, Hebrew (invert), Indonesian, Hungarian, Italian, Japanese, Korean, Malaysian, Norwegian, Persian, Polish, Portuguese, Romanian, Russian, Spanish, Swedish, Tagalog, Taiwanese, Thai, Turkish, Vietnamese, Ukrainian
- Type: Video game console emulator
- License: GNU GPLv2+
- Website: www.ppsspp.org
- Repository: github.com/hrydgard/ppsspp/

PPSSPP (an acronym for "PlayStation Portable Simulator Suitable for Playing Portably") is a free and open-source PSP emulator currently being developed for Windows, macOS, Linux, iOS, Android, Nintendo Switch, Xbox Series X/S and formerly for Wii U, BlackBerry 10, MeeGo, Pandora, DragonBox Pyra, Symbian, Maemo, Windows 10 Mobile and Xbox 360 with a focus on speed and portability. It was released to the public on November 1, 2012, licensed under the GNU GPLv2 or later. The PPSSPP project was created by Henrik Rydgård, one of the co-founders of the Dolphin emulator.

== Features and development ==
PPSSPP supports save states, dynamic recompilation (JIT) and has rudimentary support of ad hoc wireless networking. To decode PSP multimedia data PPSSPP uses the FFmpeg software library, which was enhanced to enable it to handle Sony's proprietary ATRAC3plus audio format as used by the PSP. PPSSPP offers graphical features that are enhancements over the PSP's capabilities, such as higher screen resolutions, antialiasing, image scaling, support for shaders, and linear and anisotropic filtering.

The ports of PPSSPP for mobile devices offer additional features specific to each platform, such as 'immersive mode' for Android devices, support of the multimedia buttons within Symbian devices and screen stretching on BlackBerry 10 devices to support square screens. All ports of PPSSPP for mobile devices support the use of accelerometers, keyboards and gamepads as input devices.

PPSSPP also supports the Vulkan API, which was added in v1.5.4 release and is intended to provide a substantial performance boost on supported devices.

== Portability ==
Since its inception, PPSSPP has had a focus on portability with support for multiple architectures and operating systems. While initially only supporting Microsoft Windows and Android, this quickly grew to include BlackBerry 10, Symbian, macOS, Linux and later iOS. The source code also unofficially supports a wide variety of operating systems and platforms, including Raspberry Pi, Loongson, Maemo, Universal Windows Platform (Windows 10, Windows 11, Xbox One, Xbox Series X|S, Windows 10 Mobile), MeeGo Harmattan and Pandora.

During 2013, a port was in development for Xbox 360. Although the port was abandoned, the support code remains, offering support for big-endian CPUs and DirectX compatible GPUs. A proof of concept port to the Wii U was also being worked on in 2018 and 2020. A Nintendo Switch port first released in 2019.

To aid with the portability, two cross-platform development libraries—SDL and Qt—are able to be used in addition to the non-portable Blackberry, Android, and Win32 interfaces. The Qt frontend was instrumental in adding support for platforms such as Symbian. The Qt frontend is able to support all officially supported platforms and is the suggested alternative if no native interface exists.

The project is known for trying to keep supporting older devices for relatively long. The MeeGo port saw its last release in 2013, and interest to keep up the Symbian and BlackBerry ports faded only in 2015. ARMv6 support for Android was dropped in 2014. Windows XP enjoyed official support until 2019 and Android 4.1 all the way until 2025. A so-called "Legacy Edition" exists for Android to maintain support for older devices that run on Android versions prior to the introduction of scoped storage.

As of March 2017, 984 games are playable in PPSSPP, while 67 games load to some frame of in-game state. 4 games can only reach the main menu or introduction sequence. As of July 2020, almost all games are playable in PPSSPP emulator.

In 2024 the iOS version was released on the Apple App Store, following a change in Apple's developer guidelines which now allows the publishing of emulators for legacy video game systems. The App Store release lacks the ability to use just-in-time compilation due to restrictions by Apple, though the developers also noted that contemporary Apple devices should be able to run most games at full speed even on an interpreter.

=== Platform support ===
Summary of PPSSPP platform support as of 2026
| Platform | x86-32 | x86-64 | ARM32 | ARM64 | PowerPC | RV64 | LA64 |
|---|---|---|---|---|---|---|---|
| Android | Removed | Yes | Yes | Yes | —N/a | No | —N/a |
| iOS | —N/a | —N/a | Removed? | Yes | —N/a | —N/a | —N/a |
| Windows | Yes | Yes | Unofficially, now removed | Yes | —N/a | —N/a | —N/a |
| macOS | No | No | —N/a | Yes | No | —N/a | —N/a |
| Linux | Yes | Yes | Yes | Yes | No | Yes | Yes |
| UWP | Removed | Yes | Removed | Yes | —N/a | —N/a | —N/a |
| Switch | —N/a | —N/a | —N/a | Semi-official | —N/a | —N/a | —N/a |
| DragonBox Pyra ^{†} | —N/a | —N/a | Unofficial, now abandoned | —N/a | —N/a | —N/a | —N/a |
| Pandora ^{†} | —N/a | —N/a | Unofficial, now abandoned | —N/a | —N/a | —N/a | —N/a |
| BlackBerry 10 ^{†} | ? | —N/a | Removed | —N/a | —N/a | —N/a | —N/a |
| Symbian^3 ^{†} | ? | —N/a | Removed | —N/a | —N/a | —N/a | —N/a |
| MeeGo ^{†} | ? | —N/a | Removed | —N/a | —N/a | —N/a | —N/a |
| Maemo 5 ^{†} | ? | —N/a | Removed | —N/a | —N/a | —N/a | —N/a |
| Wii U ^{†} | —N/a | —N/a | —N/a | —N/a | PoC, now removed | —N/a | —N/a |
| Xbox 360 ^{†} | —N/a | —N/a | —N/a | —N/a | PoC, now removed | —N/a | —N/a |

† Indicates a legacy or completely deprecated platform.

== See also ==
- List of PlayStation emulators
