= Utopia (typeface) =

Adobe Utopia
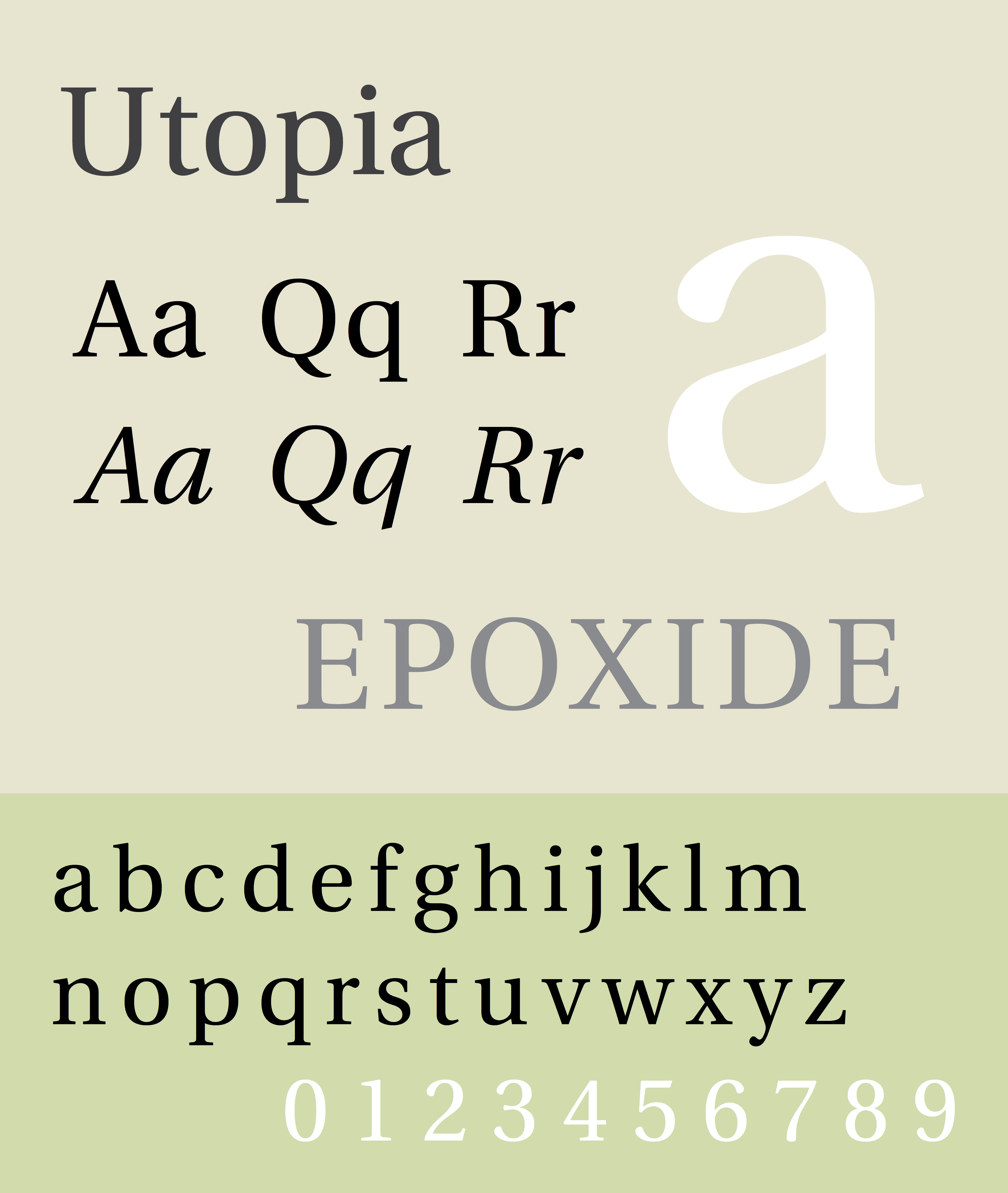
- Category: Serif
- Classification: Transitional
- Designer: Robert Slimbach
- Commissioned by: Adobe Systems
- Date released: 1989
- Shown here: Utopia Regular

Utopia is a transitional serif typeface designed by Robert Slimbach and released by Adobe Systems in 1989. The original Type 1 version of the font was released as open source software in 2006.

== Design ==
Adobe's release notes cite Baskerville and Walbaum as influences, and Adobe's Sumner Stone has also compared it to Hermann Zapf's Melior. It was one of the first typefaces to be part of Adobe's Originals programme, designed to feature a large range of styles for professional use. With a reasonably solid design, Utopia was sometimes used by newspapers.

Current versions of the typeface are released in the OpenType format and include features such as ligatures and small capitals. It is released in four optical variants, for display, headline, regular and caption text sizes, each in regular, semibold and bold weights. A black (extra-bold) weight is available in the headline size. Slimbach made some changes to the font when revisiting it for the OpenType release, and Adobe does not guarantee identical character metrics to the original version. This means documents developed using one font file should not be switched to using another, at risk of lines breaking in different places.

== Free software release ==
Uniquely for Adobe's professional typefaces, a basic set of Utopia's styles was released as open source software. Adobe donated the Utopia typeface to the X Consortium to be distributed with the X Window System. This donation included Type 1 and bitmap versions of the roman, italic, bold and bold-italic styles, with 229 glyphs for each, including ligatures but not small capitals. This release is designed for use at small text sizes, with a large x-height and thick stroke widths. There was controversy around the license due to it not explicitly including permission to modify the font files; most Linux distributions do not include the files donated to the X Consortium.

On October 11, 2006, Adobe donated the Type 1 version of the font to the TeX Users Group (TUG), this time with the copyright notice explicitly including permission to modify the font, making this version properly free software. However, Adobe explicitly states in the license agreement that it retains the rights to the Utopia name and requires modified versions of the font to be distributed under a different name.

== Derived typefaces ==
The original Utopia typeface has, since being released as free software, been modified to support glyphs in scripts other than the basic Latin script: at least three projects have emerged from the sources that Adobe has donated, one being an adaptation to Vietnamese, called Vntopia, by Hàn Thế Thành.

Another further development of the original was made by Andrey V. Panov, in an OpenType derivative called Heuristica (also: "Эвристика"), with the primary intent of adding Cyrillic symbols. Andrey has also incorporated Hàn Thế Thành's Vietnamese glyphs in Heuristica and the development of the project is open.

From the Heuristica font family, Andreas Nolda created Utopia Nova font family in 2015, changing this reserved name to Lingua Franca OpenType and Web Open Font Format fonts in 2016. Andreas Nolda added proportional figures and a stylistic set with longer slashes, matching the parentheses in height and depth to Lingua Franca OpenType and Web Open Font Format fonts.

In 2016 Stefan Peev created Linguistics Pro font family as a fork of Nolda's Utopia Nova. Linguistics Pro contains two models of Cyrillic glyphs. The base range of the Cyrillic glyphs (uni0410:uni044F) represents the modern Bulgarian letterform model. The traditional Cyrillic letterform model is included as a local feature for Russian language and as a Stylistic Set 01. Stylistic Set 02 is for Serbian and Macedonian texts (in Regular and Bold variants) and for Serbian texts in Italic and Bold Italic variants. Stylistic Set 03 is for Macedonian texts (in Italic and Bold variants). Linguistics Pro also contains polytonic Greek.

== Lawsuit ==
From 1995 to 1997, Adobe filed several complaints against Southern Software, Inc. regarding the latter company's use of the Utopia font, under the name "Veracity", in its products. In 1998, the United States District Court for the Northern District of California ruled in favor of Adobe, finding that Southern Software, Inc.'s font software infringed Adobe's copyright. Although typefaces are held to be unprotectable by copyright under United States copyright law, the court found that the control points used by the font software to generate the typeface were protectable.
