= Adobe Systems, Inc. v. Southern Software, Inc. =

United States District Court case

- Court: United States District Court for the Northern District of California
- Full case name: Adobe Systems, Inc. v. Southern Software, Inc.
- Decided: January 30, 1998
- Docket nos.: No. C-95-20710 RMW
- Citation: 1998 WL 104303, 1998 U.S.Dist. LEXIS 1941, 45 U.S.P.Q. 2d 1827 (N.D. Cal. Feb. 2, 1998)

Holding
- The court held that Adobe's font program was protectable expression, and Southern Software's font was substantially similar and infringing.

Court membership
- Judge sitting: Ronald M. Whyte

Keywords
- Typeface; United States copyright law

Adobe Systems, Inc. v. Southern Software, Inc. was a case in the United States District Court for the Northern District of California regarding the copyrightability of digitized typefaces (computer fonts). The case is notable since typeface designs in general are not protected under United States copyright law, as determined in Eltra Corp. v. Ringer. Since that case, the United States Copyright Office has published policy decisions acknowledging the registration of computer programs that generate typefaces. In this case, the court held that Adobe's Utopia font was protectable under copyright and Southern Software, Inc.'s Veracity font was substantially similar and infringing.

== Background ==
=== Eltra Corp. v. Ringer ===
In 1979, The United States Court of Appeals for the Fourth Circuit held in Eltra Corp. v. Ringer that typefaces are industrial designs which cannot exist independently as works of art.

=== 1988: Policy Decision On Copyrightability Of Digitized Typefaces ===
In 1988, the U.S. Copyright Office published a policy decision specifically addressing attempts to register fonts. The Copyright Office stated that the representation of a glyph as pixels was not protectable expression, since the raw source typeface design was not protectable, and no original authorship occurred in the conversion process.

The policy decision described the digitization of typefaces as bitmap images, which was the leading format for fonts at the time. A limitation of this format is that different sizes of the font must have different bitmap representations.

=== 1992: Registrability Of Computer Programs That Generate Typefaces ===
Having received applications to register copyrights for computer programs that generated typefaces using "typeface in digitized form", the Copyright Office revisited the 1988 Policy Decision in 1992. The Office was concerned that the claims indicated a significant technological advance since the previous policy decision. One advance was scalable font representations (Bézier curves). This format can output a font at any resolution, and stores its data as control points rather than pixels. The Office acknowledged that these fonts might involve original computer instructions to generate typefaces, and thus be protectable as computer programs, but ended saying that "The scope of the copyright will be, as in the past, a matter for the courts to determine."

== Case background ==
Adobe filed suit against Southern Software in multiple complaints between 1995 and 1997. Adobe's allegations were:

- Copyright infringement related to SSI's Key Fonts Pro products 1555 ('Veracity'), 2002 and 2003
- Copyright infringement on intermediate copying
- Patent infringement on Adobe's design patents

Adobe's fonts under dispute were created from previously digitized font files in bitmap form. Such bitmap images are not protectable under copyright, as addressed by the 1988 Policy Decision. These were imported into a program where an Adobe editor dragged control points to best match the outline of the bitmap image. When finished, these control points were translated into computer instructions to create the final font file.

Paul King, the sole employee of Southern Software, Inc. altered Adobe's Utopia font using the commercially available tools FontMonger and Fontographer. He produced three new fonts which differed trivially from the original font. These font editing programs extracted the control points from Adobe's font files and made them available for manipulation and saving to a new font file. He had scaled the coordinates of the fonts by 101% on the vertical axis in order to slightly change the fonts. Adobe also alleged that King modified the font-editing tools in order to remove Adobe's copyright notices. In total, King was accused of infringing Adobe's copyrights on more than 1100 fonts.

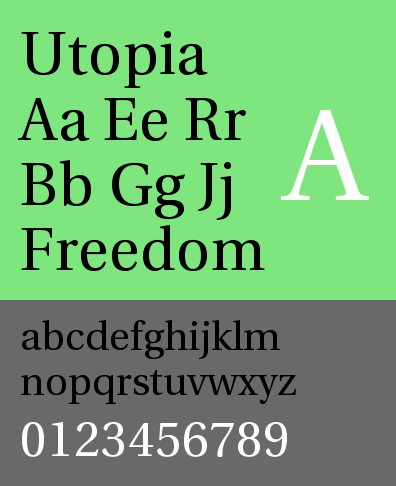
Utopia, the font allegedly copied by SSI

== Claims ==
The central issue of the case was whether or not Adobe's font program was protectable under copyright. That the output of the computer program is not protectable does not affect whether the program itself is protectable.

=== Application of Policy Decisions and Regulations ===
King contended that the Regulation of 1992 was only a clarification of 1988's Policy Decision. The regulation stated that it "does not represent a substantive change in the rights of copyright claimants." Adobe contended that the 1992 Regulation's consideration of programs that generate typefaces covered its fonts.

=== Substantial similarity ===
King argued that after application of the Abstraction-Filtration-Comparison test to Adobe's font, there could not be any remaining protectable expression, since both the input to and output of the program was unprotectable. Adobe argued that each rendering of a character by the program was the result of an editor's choices, and thus were a result of original authorship.

=== Functional concerns ===
King contended that the selection of control points in glyph outlines was determined by efficiency, namely, the minimization of control points. Adobe contended that the outlines only determined some of the control points, and that there was creativity involved in picking the rest. One glyph may be expressed identically in a variety of ways with different numbers of control points.

=== Protection under patent ===
Typeface designs may be protectable by a design patent under United States patent law. The requirements are more strict than those for copyright. Term of protection is 14 years from filing date. SSI claimed that the six design patents Adobe held related to its fonts were invalid since they did not disclose any article of manufacture. They also claimed that the designs lacked the required novelty and nonobviousness to be valid. Adobe's response was that the computer program was a sufficient article of manufacture. A previous case, before the U.S. Patent and Trademark Office's Board of Patent Appeals and Interferences, had held that novel and non-obvious typefaces designs could be subject to a design patent. Adobe used the deposition of the font's designer to attempt to show that the font was novel and non-obvious.

== Analysis and holdings ==
The court held that Adobe's Utopia font was protectable expression, and that King infringed upon Adobe's copyright. Essentially, the court determined that the choice of control points by the type designer was a work of original authorship. The facts that the court used to reach this conclusion were that:

- Creativity was involved in the selection of control points, since two independent type designers could begin with the same images and produce indistinguishable output, yet with few control points in common.
- King's modifications to Adobe's fonts were mechanical and did not eliminate copyright infringement. Since the font editing programs extracted control points from Adobe's fonts, use of those programs constituted copying of literal expression. Thus, King also infringed on Adobe's copyright through intermediate copying into RAM.

However, the court declined to support Adobe's patent claims, stating that both the novelty and non-obviousness of Adobe's fonts was a "genuine issue of material fact."

== See also ==
- Intellectual property protection of typefaces
