= Hqx =

hqx may refer to:

- .hqx, the file name extension of BinHex-encoded binary files since 1985
- hqx (algorithm), a set of algorithms for image upscaling
