= Server Normal Format =

Server Normal Format (SNF) is a bitmap font format used by X Window. It is one of the oldest X Window font formats. Nowadays it is rarely used, however it is still supported by the latest X.org server. SNF fonts had the problem of being platform dependent, therefore they needed to be compiled on each system. In 1991, X11 moved away from SNF fonts to Portable Compiled Format, which could be shared between systems.

== See also ==
- Glyph Bitmap Distribution Format
- Portable Compiled Format
