= PSF =

PSF is an abbreviation that may refer to:

== Organisations ==
=== Political parties ===
- French Social Party (Parti Social Français) (1936–1940), a right-wing nationalist party
- French Socialist Party (Parti Socialiste Français), active since 1969
- Palestinian Popular Struggle Front
- Peoples Students Federation, the youth wing of the Pakistan People's Party
- Provisional Sinn Féin, Ireland
- Socialist Party without Borders (Parti Socialiste sans Frontières), a leftist party in Chad

=== Law enforcement ===
- Public Security Forces the principal law-enforcement arm of the Bahraini Ministry of Interior
- Puntland Security Force, Somalia

=== Business and companies ===
- P.S.F. Records, a record label
- Pennsylvania Shakespeare Festival, a professional theatre company
- Professional service firm, a company offering consulting, legal, or other services
- Premium Standard Farms, Inc, a pork producer
- Pressed Steel Fisher, a supplier of British car parts

=== Other organisations ===
- Pakistan Science Foundation
- Pharmaciens Sans Frontières
- Phelps Stokes Fund, a non-profit foundation
- Pondicherry Science Forum
- Python Software Foundation

== Science and technology ==
=== Software and hardware ===
- PC Screen Font, a font format used in Linux systems
- Physical Storage Format, a data format for navigation data
- Portable Sound Format, a file format
- Progressive segmented frame, a scheme to handle progressive scan video using interlaced equipment
- Point spread function, the response of an imaging system to a point source
- Protein Segment Finder, a search engine for the Protein Data Bank
- Protein structure file for molecular dynamics, a chemical file format

=== Chemistry ===
- Polysulfone, a high-performance thermoplastic
- Potassium fluorosilicate, specifically when referring to phosphors

=== Other science and technology ===
- Performance shaping factor, factor which poses a likelihood of influencing the success or failure of the performance of a task
- Posterior spinal fusion
- Prolate spheroidal wave function

== Units ==
- Pounds per square foot, a measure of pressure; see also Pounds per square inch
- Price per square foot

== Other ==
- Pittsfield Municipal Airport (IATA airport code: PSF)
