= Intellectual property protection of typefaces =

Typefaces, fonts, and their glyphs raise intellectual property considerations in copyright, trademark, design patent, and related laws. The copyright status of a typeface and of any font file that describes it digitally varies between jurisdictions. In the United States, the shapes of typefaces are not eligible for copyright but may be protected by design patent (although it is rarely applied for, the first US design patent that was ever awarded was for a typeface). Typefaces can be protected in other countries, including the United Kingdom, Germany, and France, by industrial design protections that are similar to copyright or design patent in that they protect the abstract shapes. Additionally, in the US and some other countries, computer fonts, the digital instantiation of the shapes as vector outlines, may be protected by copyright on the computer code that produces them. The name of a typeface may also be protected as a trademark.

== Copyright ==
=== Germany ===
In 1981, West Germany passed the Gesetz zum Wiener Abkommen vom 12. Juni 1973 über den Schutz typographischer Schriftzeichen und ihre internationale Hinterlegung ("Law on the 1973 Vienna Agreement for the Protection of Type Faces and their International Deposit", also simply known as Schriftzeichengesetz or "Type Faces Law"), according to which a typeface is initially protected under German copyright law for 10 years from first publication onwards. After the end of the initial ten-year period, the rights holder may pay a fee to prolong copyright status for one additional 15 years period. According to German law, every typeface thus ends up in the public domain after no more than 25 years from first publication onwards, when it is also free to be digitized into a computer font, which in itself holds a much higher copyright protection status by German law than analogue typefaces because it is legally classified as a computer program.

The name of a typeface can separately be registered as a trademark (Wortmarke) for a fee, which, like a digital font, also holds much higher copyright protection status than an analogue typeface itself. If a typeface's name is trademarked, no other typeface may bear the same name, including digital clones of the analogue typeface.

=== Ireland ===
Irish copyright law covers typefaces. Like the United Kingdom law (see below), the Republic of Ireland allows for using the typeface in the ordinary course of printing. The term of protection is 15 years from first publication.

=== Israel ===
Courts in Israel have recognized copyright in Henri Friedlaender's Hadassah typeface for a term exceeding 48 years, forcing Masterfont's unauthorized digitization off the market.

=== Japan ===
The copyright law of Japan has not held typefaces to be covered in Japan by copyright on the ground that they function primarily as a means of communicating information, rather than an appeal to aesthetic appreciation.

=== Russia ===
The copyright law of Russia has a legal vacuum with Soviet intellectual legacy combined with absence of specific law regulation of the fonts. That created the opposite situation in which all typefaces have copyright, and payments can be collected by current law. According to the Russian Yur'yev legal bureau, at least 99 legal threats by Lebedev's design studio have been about the use of studio made typefaces in Russia without payment.

=== South Korea ===
The Supreme Court of South Korea has ruled that typefaces are not protected by copyright because they function primarily as a means of communicating information.

=== Switzerland ===
The copyright law of Switzerland has no specific law for the protection of typefaces. So far, the jurisdiction has been very reluctant in admitting legal protection of any sort to typefaces in Switzerland. However, the denied protection is not imperative since in theory, typefaces could be protected based on both copyright and design law. Additionally, the name of a typeface can be protected by a trademark.

=== United Kingdom ===
In 1916, England recognized copyright in typefaces but protected only the design with all the letters in their particular order. The current United Kingdom copyright statute, enacted in 1989, expressly refers to copyrights in typeface designs. English law considers that fonts are subject to copyright, but that covers typefaces for only 25 years from first publication and does not cover their usage by typographers.

=== United States ===
Typefaces cannot be protected by copyright in the United States. The idea that typefaces cannot be copyrighted in the United States has been black letter law since the introduction of Code of Federal Regulations, Ch 37, Sec. 202.1(e) in 1992. The legal precedent that typefaces are not eligible for protection under U.S. copyright law was established before that in 1978 in Eltra Corp. v. Ringer. However, fonts can be protected by design patent, and computer programs that implement typefaces may be protected by copyright.

Typefaces and their letter forms are considered utilitarian objects whose public utility outweighs any private interest in protecting their creative elements under US law, but the computer program that is used to display a typeface, a font file (Note: In computing parlance, a distinction is sometimes drawn between the font as the computer program and the typeface as the shapes the program produces. However, both terms are often used synonymously, and the Copyright Office uses them equivalently to refer to typefaces.) of computer instructions in a domain-specific programming language may be protectable by copyright. In 1992, the US Copyright Office determined that digital outline fonts had elements that could be protected as software if the source code of the font file "contains a sufficient amount of original authorship". Since that time, the Office has accepted registration of copyright for digital vector fonts, such as PostScript Type 1, TrueType, and OpenType format files. As computer programs are protected as literary works in the United States, a font file program can only be eligible for copyright protection in the US if the source code of the computer instructions within the file was written by a human; due to the prominence of modern user-friendly digital font editor programs, this method of creating a font file is now quite rare.

Historically, the unavailability of protection for typefaces reaches back to at least 1976. In 1988, the Copyright Office published a report titled Policy Decision on Copyrightability of Digitized Typefaces, which explains: "The decision in Eltra Corp. v. Ringer clearly comports with the intention of the Congress. Whether typeface designs should be protected by copyright was considered and specifically rejected by Congress in passing the Copyright Act of 1976. The 1976 House Report states: A "typeface" can be defined as a set of letters, numbers, or other symbolic characters, whose forms are related by repeating design elements consistently applied in a notational system and are intended to be embodied in articles whose intrinsic utilitarian function is for use in composing text or other cognizable combinations of characters. The Committee does not regard the design of typeface, as thus defined, to be a copyrightable "pictorial, graphic, or sculptural work" within the meaning of this bill and the application of the dividing line in section 101 [H.R. Reg. No. 1476, 94th Cong., 2nd Sess 5 (1976)].

In addition to rejecting copyright protection for typeface designs, Congress deferred a decision on a more limited form of protection under proposed ornamental design legislation. Title II of the 1976 copyright revision bill as passed by the Senate could have protected typeface designs, but the House of Representatives had doubts about the limited form of protection. Consequently, only copyright revision passed. [H.R. Reg. No. 1476 at 50 and 55]. Design legislation has yet to be enacted, and Congress has chosen not to include typeface designs within the Copyright Act's definition of pictorial, graphic, or sculptural works."

According to section 906.4 of the Compendium of U.S. Copyright Office Practices, typography and calligraphy also cannot be copyrighted in themselves.

== Design patents ==
Typefaces may be protected by a design patent in many countries (either automatically, by registration, or by some combination thereof). A design patent is the strongest system of protection, but the most uncommon. It is the only US legal precedent that protects the actual design (the design of the individual shapes of the letters) of the font. The Lucida font family was one group that was formerly protected by design patent.

Another prominent example is the European Union, where the automatic protection (without registration) expires after three years and can be extended (by registration) up to 25 years.

In 1981, Germany passed a special extension (Schriftzeichengesetz) to the design patent law (Geschmacksmustergesetz) for protecting typeface designs. This also permits typefaces to be registered as designs.

The US allows design patents for typefaces. In fact, the very first design patent awarded in the US (U.S. patent D1), in 1842, was for a typeface designed by George Bruce. Currently, US design patents are for 15 years from the date of grant (previously 14 years).

== Trademarks ==
The names of particular fonts may be protected by a trademark. This is the weakest form of protection because only the font name itself is being protected. For example, the letters that make up the trademarked font Palatino can be copied but the name must be changed.

URW++ was involved in a 1995 lawsuit with Monotype Corporation for cloning their fonts and naming them with a name starting with the same three letters. As typeface shapes themselves cannot be copyrighted in the United States, the lawsuit centered on trademark infringement. A US court decided that Monotype's trademarks were "fanciful" and did not have descriptive value of the actual products. However it also decided that URW was confusing the public deliberately because "the purloining of the first part of a well-known trademark and the appending of it to a worthless suffix is a method of trademark poaching long condemned by the courts." The court issued an injunction preventing URW from using their chosen names.

== Licensing ==
The basic standard for copyrighted digital font use is that a license is required for each individual font used on a computer, or in the case of businesses, one per entity. Under the license fonts are typically licensed only for use on one computer. These end-user license agreements (EULAs) generally state that fonts may only be used on machines that have a valid license. These fonts cannot be shared by multiple computers or given to others. These licenses can be obtained in three ways: directly from the font authors (e.g., Adobe), as part of a larger software package (e.g., Microsoft Office), or through purchasing or downloading the font from an authorized outlet.

Such licenses typically only apply to the font file itself (which is a computer program), and not to the shape of the typeface, which may be subject to a design patent.

Open-source font licenses include the GNU General Public License with the Font Exception, the SIL Open Font License, and the Ubuntu Font License.

== Lawsuits ==
From 1993 to 1995, Bitstream Inc. and four other type companies successfully sued SWFTE for copyright infringement. SWFTE was using special computer programs to take other type founders' fonts, convert them, and give them new names. The case focused on the fact that SWFTE had used Bitstream's software to create these new fonts.

Adobe Systems, Inc. v. Southern Software, Inc. helped clear the distinction between intellectual property protection for a font and a typeface. SSI had used the FontMonger program to copy and rename fonts from Adobe and others. They assumed safety from prosecution because they had directly copied the points that define the shapes from Adobe's fonts, but they had made slight adjustments to all the points so that they were not technically identical. Nevertheless, it was determined that the computer code had been copied.

On 21 January 2016, Font Brothers filed a lawsuit against Hasbro, claiming that Hasbro used the "Generation B" font for its My Little Pony products without permission. Font Brothers claimed that Hasbro had refused to comply with its licensing request. It is also claiming substantial damages, from loss of revenue for that misuse and requesting a jury trial to resolve this matter. The case was dismissed with prejudice, at Font Brother's request, about two months later.

Most recently, Berthold LLC sued Target Corporation for its alleged breach of a font license agreement. Berthold LLC v. Target Corp., No. 1:17-cv-07180 (N.D. Ill.). The lawsuit claimed that Target gave Calango, a design firm that Target had hired, copies of Berthold's font software without permission. The case was dismissed with prejudice in 2018.

== See also ==
- Legal aspects of computing
- Intellectual property
