= Portable Compiled Format =

- Filename extension: .pcf
- Internet media type: application/x-font-pcf
- Developed by: X.Org Foundation
- Type of format: Bitmap font format
- Open format?: yes
- Website: The X11 PCF bitmap font file format

Portable Compiled Format (PCF) is a bitmap font format used by X Window System in its core font system, and has been used for decades. PCF fonts are usually installed, by default, on most Unix-based operating systems, and are used in terminals such as xterm. PCF fonts replaced Bitmap Distribution Format due to a slight efficiency increase, however most applications have moved on to scalable fonts.

== See also ==
- Glyph Bitmap Distribution Format
- Server Normal Format
