= Glyph Bitmap Distribution Format =

File format for storing bitmap fonts

- Filename extension: .bdf
- Internet media type: application/x-font-bdf
- Developed by: Adobe Inc.
- Initial release: 1987; 39 years ago
- Latest release: 2.2; 22 March 1993; 33 years ago
- Type of format: Bitmap font format
- Open format?: yes
- Website: Adobe Glyph Bitmap Distribution Format (BDF) Specification, version 2.2

The Glyph Bitmap Distribution Format (BDF) by Adobe is a file format for storing bitmap fonts. The content takes the form of a text file intended to be human- and computer-readable. BDF is typically used in Unix X Window environments. It has largely been replaced by the PCF font format which is somewhat more efficient, and by scalable fonts such as OpenType and TrueType fonts.

== Overview ==
In 1988, the X Consortium adopted BDF 2.1 as a standard for X Window screen fonts, but X Window has largely moved to other font standards such as PCF, Opentype, and Truetype.

Version 2.2 added support for non-Western writing. For example, glyphs in a BDF 2.2 font definition can specify rendering from top-to-bottom rather than simply left-to-right.

A BDF font file contains three sections:

1. a global section that applies to all glyphs in a font;
2. a section with a separate entry for each glyph; and
3. the ENDFONT statement.

== Example ==
This is an example font containing one glyph, for ASCII capital "A". This glyph is taken from the GNU Unifont.

STARTFONT 2.1 
FONT -gnu-unifont-medium-r-normal--16-160-75-75-c-80-iso10646-1
SIZE 16 75 75
FONTBOUNDINGBOX 16 16 0 -2
STARTPROPERTIES 2
FONT_ASCENT 14
FONT_DESCENT 2
ENDPROPERTIES
CHARS 1
STARTCHAR U+0041
ENCODING 65
SWIDTH 500 0
DWIDTH 8 0
BBX 8 16 0 -2
BITMAP
00
00
00
00
18
24
24
42
42
7E
42
42
42
42
00
00
ENDCHAR
ENDFONT

Decoded hexdraw representation of the example

00 00000000 --------
00 00000000 --------
00 00000000 --------
00 00000000 --------
18 00011000 ---██---
24 00100100 --█--█--
24 00100100 --█--█--
42 01000010 -█----█-
42 01000010 -█----█-
7E 01111110 -██████-
42 01000010 -█----█-
42 01000010 -█----█-
42 01000010 -█----█-
42 01000010 -█----█-
00 00000000 --------
00 00000000 --------
 
.. ........ .248124.

In the above example, the global declarations begin with the STARTFONT line and end with the CHARS line.

STARTFONT 2.1 defines the version of this BDF file as version 2.1.

FONT -gnu-unifont-medium-r-normal--16-160-75-75-c-80-iso10646-1 defines the font family and face names as an X logical font description.

SIZE 16 75 75 defines this to be a 16 point font, with an X-axis resolution of 75 dots per inch (dpi) and a Y-axis resolution of 75 dpi. This is the norm under X Window.

FONTBOUNDINGBOX 16 16 0 -2 defines a bounding box for the font of 16 pixels wide by 16 pixels high, with the lower left-hand corner starting at x = 0 and y = -2. Note that although the bounding box is defined to be a 16 by 16 cell, this can be overridden for individual glyphs. The "A" glyph, for example, is only 8 pixels wide.

STARTPROPERTIES 2 declares that two special properties will follow. STARTPROPERTIES is optional in the BDF specification. X Window allows the properties FONT_ASCENT and FONT_DESCENT to show the height above and below the baseline, respectively, for all glyphs. FONT_ASCENT 14 declares that 14 of the 16 pixels in height are above the baseline. FONT_DESCENT 2 declares that 2 of the 16 pixels in height are below the baseline. ENDPROPERTIES appears at the end of the STARTPROPERTIES section.

CHARS 1 declares that one character will follow. Although Adobe now refers to this file format as the Glyph BDF, they have retained the keyword CHARS in the final version of the specification.

Lines beginning with the word COMMENT can be inserted within a BDF file. Anything following the COMMENT keyword on a line is ignored.

Following the above global declarations, the following entries may repeat for each glyph.

STARTCHAR U+0041 specifies the start of a character in version 2.1 and earlier, or of a glyph in version 2.2. The string name of this particular character is U+0041, expressing in the Unicode convention the code point hexadecimal 41 (decimal 65, the ASCII character “A”). In version 2.1 and earlier, the character name string was limited to 14 characters. In version 2.2, the glyph name string can contain up to 65,535 characters.

ENCODING 65 declares the decimal code point for this glyph in the font.

SWIDTH 500 0 declares the scalable width of 500 on the X-axis and 0 (by default) on the Y-axis. This will result in an X-axis offset to the next glyph, but no Y-axis offset to the next glyph (i.e., the glyphs appear straight across in a line). The scalable width is 1000 times the actual point size of the character—the same unit used in an Adobe Font Metric (AFM) file. The number of pixels calculated as Pixels = (Scalable Width)/1000 * Resolution/72, where Scalable Width is 500 in this example, and resolution is 75 dpi for this font. Because 75 is approximately equal to 72, the number of pixels is the full width of a glyph (defined globally as 16 pixels) times 500/1000, or in other words the width of this glyph is 8 pixels.

DWIDTH 8 0 declares the device width of a glyph. In this case, after the glyph is rendered, the start of the next glyph is offset 8 pixels on the X-axis and 0 pixels on the Y-axis from the current glyph origin. Note that the device width is not necessarily equal to the width of the glyph. It is simply the offset on the X-axis to move the current point to the start of the next glyph.

The scalable width is used to calculate the width of a high-resolution glyph on a printer, whereas the device width is used to calculate the width of a glyph on a display device. Thus the scalable width is specified to greater precision than the device width.

BBX 8 16 0 -2 declares a bounding box that is 8 pixels wide and 16 pixels tall. The lower left-hand corner of the character is offset by 0 pixels on the X-axis and -2 pixels on the Y-axis.

BITMAP begins the bitmap for the current glyph. This line must be followed by one line per pixel on the Y-axis. In this example the glyph is 16 pixels tall, so 16 lines follow. Each line contains the hexadecimal representation of pixels in a row. A “1” bit indicates a rendered pixel. Each line is rounded to an 8 bit (one byte) boundary, padded with zeroes on the right. In this example, the glyph is exactly 8 pixels wide, and so occupies exactly 8 bits (one byte) per line so that there is no padding. The most significant bit of a line of raster data represents the leftmost pixel.

ENDCHAR ends the current glyph.

The declarations STARTCHAR through ENDCHAR are repeated for each glyph in a font.

ENDFONT appears as the last line in the file, after all glyphs in the font have been enumerated.

== Version 2.2 extensions ==
Version 2.2 of the BDF specification adds support for non-Western fonts. These additions allow moving the origin by a positive or negative movement on the X and Y axes. This not only accommodates right-to-left writing direction, but even top-to-bottom (for example, for Chinese). The following values provide multinational-font support:

METRICSET is set to 0 for writing direction 0, 1 for writing direction 1, or 2 (in the initial global area) for both writing directions within the same font. Traditional Western left-to-right scripts use METRICSET 0.

SWIDTH1 and DWIDTH1 have the same parameters as SWIDTH and DWIDTH, respectively. DWIDTH1 must be present for a METRICSET 1 glyph. Its offsets can be positive or negative.

VVECTOR defines an X-axis offset and a Y-axis offset to transition from a mode 0 glyph to a mode 1 glyph. An opposite offset is applied during a mode 1 to mode 0 glyph transition.

This scheme easily accommodates two writing directions. Historically, fonts had 128 or 256 code points. Today, Unicode allows for over one million code points. Fonts can conceivably contain thousands of glyphs, some of which should be written left-to-right, some right-to-left, and some top-to-bottom. Such multi-directional writing requires creative use of DWIDTH1 and SWIDTH1 for each glyph.

In addition to keywords added for international support, version 2.2 adds the CONTENTVERSION declaration. This keyword is followed by an integer to indicate the version number of the font.

For more detailed information, consult the version 2.2 specification.

== X Window properties ==
X Window font utilities support several properties that can be specified in the STARTPROPERTIES section of a BDF file. A generic BDF file is in ASCII encoding. X Window properties are specified using ISO 8859-1 encoding, which is an extension of ASCII. These properties include:

- CAP_HEIGHT (integer) The height above the baseline of a capital letter (See Cap height).
- COPYRIGHT (string) A copyright statement.
- DEFAULT_CHAR (unsigned integer) The default character (glyph) to display for an undefined glyph.
- FACE_NAME (string) The name of the face for this font.
- FONT (string) The X Window name of the font.
- FONT_ASCENT (integer) The height above the baseline, for line spacing calculation.
- FONT_DESCENT (integer) The descender below the baseline, for line spacing calculation.
- FONT_VERSION (string) The version of the font.
- FOUNDRY (string) The name of the foundry.
- FAMILY_NAME (string) The font family name.
- NOTICE (string) A general comment.
- POINT_SIZE (integer) See Point (typography). If it is not separately specified, EMspace = round(POINT_SIZE/10), ENspace = round(POINT_SIZE/20), and THINspace = round(POINT_SIZE/30).
- RESOLUTION_X (unsigned integer)
- RESOLUTION_Y (unsigned integer)
- SLANT (string) “R” is roman, “I” is italic, “O” is oblique, “RI” is reverse italic, “RO” is reverse oblique, “OT” is other, and a number indicates polymorphic slant capability.
- WEIGHT_NAME (string) The weight of this font (“Bold” and “Normal” are typical, though there is no set enumeration).
- X_HEIGHT (integer) The height above the baseline of a lower-case “x” (See x-height).
