= PC Screen Font =

Bitmap font file format

PC Screen Font (PSF) is a bitmap font format currently employed by the Linux kernel for console fonts. Documentation of the PSF file format can be found within the source code of the Linux kbd utilities. The format is described by the University of Eindhoven.

== File format ==
=== File header ===
Every PSF file begins with a header. There are two header types: PSF1 and PSF2. All multibyte integers are in least significant byte order (little endian).

psf1 header
Length	Description	Notes
2	Magic bytes	Always 36 04
1	PSF Font mode	Various font flags, see font modes
1	Glyph size	Glyph size in bytes, 8 bit unsigned integer. For psf1, the character size always equals the glyph height

psf2 header
Length	Description	Notes
4	Magic bytes	Always 72 b5 4a 86
4	Version	32 bit unsigned integer, currently always 0
4	Header Size	32 bit unsigned integer, size of the header in bytes (usually 32)
4	Flags	32 bit unsigned integer, see Font flags
4	Length	32 bit unsigned integer, number of glyphs
4	Glyph size	32 bit unsigned integer, number of bytes per glyph
4	Height	32 bit unsigned integer, height of each glyph
4	Width	32 bit unsigned integer, width of each glyph

All psf1 glyphs are 8 pixels wide.

==== Font modes ====
The font mode in a psf1 header is an 8-bit unsigned integer containing various flags about the font

Font mode bits
Value (hex)	Name	Meaning
0x01	PSF1_MODE512	If this bit is set, the font face will have 512 glyphs. If it is unset, then the font face will have just 256 glyphs.
0x02	PSF1_MODEHASTAB	If this bit is set, the font face will have a unicode table.
0x04	PSF1_MODESEQ	Equivalent to PSF1_MODEHASTAB

==== Font flags ====
The font flags field in a PSF2 header is a 32-bit unsigned integer containing various flags about the font. There is currently only one flag.

Font flag bits
Value (hex)	Name	Meaning
0x00000001	PSF2_HAS_UNICODE_TABLE	If this bit is set, the font face will have a unicode table

=== File bitmaps ===
The actual glyph data immediately follows the header. Each bit in each glyph represents one pixel in the font: 0 for undrawn, 1 for drawn. Each row of each glyph is padded to a whole number of bytes. For example, a 12x12 font would have 2 bytes per row. The letter 'A' in a 12x12 PSF bitmap may look like this:

           padding
 Font data    |
+----------+ +--+
000001100000 0000
000011110000 0000
000110011000 0000
001100001100 0000
011000000110 0000
110000000011 0000
111111111111 0000
111111111111 0000
110000000011 0000
110000000011 0000
110000000011 0000
110000000011 0000

with twelve bits of actual data and padding to fill each row to the nearest byte. Rows are stored left-most column first.

=== The unicode table ===
If a PSF file contains a Unicode table, then every glyph has an entry in the Unicode table, with the first glyph corresponding to the first entry in the table, the second glyph to the second entry, and so on. The format of an entry in the Unicode table depends on the type of the PSF header.

==== The PSF1 unicode table ====
Entries in the Unicode table of a PSF1 file are represented as a series of 16-bit little-endian unsigned integers ending in 0xffff. The first integers in the entry contain a Unicode character represented by the corresponding glyph. These Unicode characters continue until the integer 0xfffe is encountered. Then, starting from the 0xfffe value, rather than representing individual Unicode characters, the numbers represent series of Unicode characters that correspond to the glyph, starting a new series with every 0xfffe encountered and stopping once 0xffff is encountered. For example, the following series of 16-bit little-endian unsigned integers would be interpreted in the following way:

0xdead
0xbeef

0xfffe
0x3141
0x5926

0xfffe
0x1234
0x5678

0xffff

Whenever either U+dead, U+beef, the sequence U+3141 U+5926, or the sequence U+1234 U+5678 is seen, display the glyph corresponding to this Unicode table entry.

==== The PSF2 unicode table ====
Entries in the Unicode table of a PSF2 file are the same as those in a PSF1 file, except Unicode characters are represented in UTF-8, Unicode sequences begin with the one-byte value 0xfe (rather than the two-byte value 0xfffe), and Unicode entries end with the one-byte value0xff (rather than the two-byte value 0xffff). Neither of the values 0xfe can occur in valid UTF-8 sequences.
