= Eltra Corp. v. Ringer =

United States Court of Appeals case

Eltra Corporation v. Barbara A. Ringer
- Court: United States Court of Appeals for the Fourth Circuit
- Full case name: Eltra Corp. v. Barbara A. Ringer, International Typographic Composition Association and Advertising Typographers Association of America, Inc.
- Argued: June 14 1978
- Decided: June 14 1978
- Citation: 579 F.2d 294

Case history
- Prior history: Appeal from The U.S. District Court for the Eastern District of Virginia

Holding
- Found that typefaces were not protectable expression.

Court membership
- Judges sitting: Harrison Lee Winter, Donald S. Russell, Hiram Emory Widener, Jr.

Keywords
- Typeface, United states copyright law

Eltra Corp. v. Ringer, 579 F.2d 294 (4th Cir. 1978), was a case in the United States Court of Appeals for the Fourth Circuit that determined that typefaces were not eligible for protection under U.S. copyright law. The United States Copyright Office had refused to register a typeface design owned by Eltra Corporation, who filed suit in the U.S. District Court for the Eastern District of Virginia. The district court held that the design submitted did not qualify as a "work of art" under Regulation 202.10(c) of the 1909 Copyright Act. The appellate court affirmed this decision.
