= Intellectual property protection by Nintendo =

Nintendo is one of the largest video game publishers in the world, producing both hardware and software. Since the release of the Nintendo Entertainment System in 1985, the company has generally been proactive to assure its intellectual property in both hardware and software is legally protected. Nintendo's protection of its properties began as early as the arcade release of Donkey Kong which was widely cloned on other platforms, a practice common to the most popular arcade games of the era. Nintendo did seek legal action to try to stop release of these unauthorized clones, but estimated they still lost $100 million in potential sales to these clones. Nintendo also fought off a claim in 1983 by Universal Pictures that Donkey Kong was a derivative element of their King Kong in Universal City Studios, Inc. v. Nintendo Co., Ltd.; notably, Nintendo's lawyer, John Kirby, became the namesake of Kirby in honor of the successful defense.

Nintendo frequently issues DMCA notices against emulators, mods, ROM hacks and fan-made games. While publications like Engadget describe these actions as "within [Nintendo's] right", the company's hostile stance is much maligned and criticised within the video game community.

== Copyright circumvention ==
Nintendo became more proactive as they entered the Famicom/NES period. Nintendo had witnessed the events of a flooded game market that occurred in the United States in the early 1980s that led to the 1983 video game crash, and with the Famicom had taken business steps, such as controlling the cartridge production process, to prevent a similar flood of video game clones. The Famicom, however, had lacked any lockout mechanics, and numerous unauthorized bootleg cartridges were made across the Asian regions. Nintendo took a step to create its "Nintendo Seal of Quality" stamped on the games it made to dissuade consumers from purchasing these bootlegs, and as it prepared the Famicom for entry to Western regions as the NES, incorporated a lock-out system that only allowed authorized game cartridges they manufactured to be playable on the system. After the NES's release, Nintendo took legal action against companies that attempted to reverse-engineer the lockout mechanism to make unauthorized games for the NES. While Nintendo was successful to prevent reverse engineering of the lockout chip in the case Atari Games Corp. v. Nintendo of America Inc., they failed to prevent devices like Game Genie from being used to provide cheat codes for players in the case Lewis Galoob Toys, Inc. v. Nintendo of America, Inc.. The Blockbuster rental chain settled with Nintendo in the Nintendo of America, Inc. v. Blockbuster Entertainment Corp. case after they began including photocopies of Nintendo's game manuals in rented games.

A unique exception was the Christian video game developer Wisdom Tree, which was an offshoot of unlicensed game developer Color Dreams who previously published NES titles without Nintendo's approval, resorting to workarounds such as a voltage spike to temporarily knock the CIC chip offline, bypassing the NES's security. Color Dreams previously faced difficulties selling their games to mainstream retailers as Nintendo threatened to cease selling games to retailers that sold unlicensed NES games. Unlike most developers of unlicensed NES games, Nintendo remained reticent and did not take legal action against Wisdom Tree, likely due to fears of a public relations backlash from parents and religious groups.

In 2021, Gary Bowser was sentenced to 40 months in prison and ordered to pay $14.5 million in restitution for his role in a Nintendo hacking scheme. Critics claim that the punishment was excessive, while others argue that it was necessary to send a message to deter other hackers and protect intellectual property rights. Bowser's recent release from jail has brought attention to the impact that the massive amount of money he owes in restitution may have on his life and livelihood, as he claims to have only been able to pay off a small fraction of the fine so far. During the hacking scheme, Bowser personally made only $320,000 in profit.

Nintendo initiated two lawsuits against users for circumventing copyright and facilitating copyright infringement in June 2024. One was against the owner of ModdedHardware, a website that sold modified Switch units and components that bypassed Nintendo's protections. Nintendo won the case and was awarded $2 million from the site owner in September 2025, as well a permanent injunction forcing the site to shut down and be transferred to Nintendo. The other was against one of the lead moderators of the Reddit subforum r/SwitchPirates, which had over 190,000 members that traded Nintendo software stripped of copyright protections. The defendant in the second claim failed to show up for initial court hearings, causing Nintendo to seek subpoenas for other members of the r/SwitchPirates group, including through Discord and Google records. By October 2025, Nintendo has discovered the identity of the Reddit moderator, and was able to win a default judgement of $4.5 million in damages from the person in September 2026.

Within the Nintendo Switch 2, Nintendo included the ability to detect the use of modified game cartridges that can be used to work around the console's copy protection, such as by storing ROM dumps of game carts; one such example being the Mig Flash. Users that had used these found that they were blocked from using any of Nintendo's online services.

== Emulation ==
Nintendo has used emulation by itself or licensed from third parties to provide means to re-release games from their older platforms on newer systems, with Virtual Console, which re-released classic games as downloadable titles, the Nintendo Classics library for Nintendo Switch Online subscribers, and with dedicated consoles like the NES and Super NES Classic Editions. Nintendo, however, has taken a hard stance against unlicensed emulation of its video games and consoles, stating that it is the single largest threat to the intellectual property rights of video game developers. A patent attorney for Nintendo, Koji Nishiura, said of the company's stance on emulation, "While you can't immediately claim that an emulator is illegal in itself, it can become illegal depending on how it's used", and cited examples of emulation disabling security features or providing links for acquiring game ROMs as cases they consider illegal. Further, Nintendo has taken action against fan-made games which have used significant facets of their IP, issuing cease & desist letters to these projects or Digital Millennium Copyright Act (DMCA)-related complaints to services that host these projects. The company has also taken legal action against those that made modchips for its hardware; notably, in 2020 and 2021, Nintendo took action against Team Xecuter which had been making modchips for Nintendo's consoles since 2013, after members of that team were arrested by the United States Department of Justice. In a related action, Nintendo sent a cease and desist letter to the organizers of the 2020 The Big House Super Smash Bros. tournament that was held entirely online due to the COVID-19 pandemic that year. Nintendo had taken issue with the tournament using emulated versions of Super Smash Bros. Melee which had included a user mod for networked play, as this would have required ripping a copy of Melee to play, an action they do not condone.

Nintendo issued Valve a DMCA request prior the release of the Dolphin emulator for Wii and GameCube games on the Steam storefront in May 2023, asserting that the inclusion of the Wii Common Key used to decrypt Wii games violated their copyright. In 2024, Nintendo took legal action against the open-source Yuzu emulator for Switch games, stating that the software violates the DMCA by enabling decryption of the encryption method used for Switch games, and that it facilitated copyright infringement of The Legend of Zelda: Tears of the Kingdom through a leaked copy that had been downloaded a million times from piracy websites prior to the game's official release. The Yuzu team settled with Nintendo, agreeing to pay $2.4 million and stopping work on Yuzu, halting distribution of the code, and turning its domains and websites over to Nintendo. As some of the Yuzu team had also worked on the Citra 3DS emulator, that project was also terminated, and its code was taken offline. Some users not associated with the Yuzu team had attempted to fork the latest builds of Yuzu before it was taken offline, taking stances to completely avoid discussions related to the encryption aspects and any software piracy. Nintendo continued to issue DMCA requests to remove source repositories as well as Discord servers established by these users to discuss their forks' development. In October, Nintendo forced Ryujinx, an open-source alternative to Yuzu, to shut down its activities, broadening its crackdown on Nintendo Switch emulation. The developers were contacted by Nintendo to stop working on the project, remove the organization and all its related assets. Nintendo took more action to issue takedowns of Yuzu offshoots from GitHub in August 2026.

== Fan games ==
Fan games that reuse or recreate Nintendo assets also have been targeted by Nintendo typically through cease and desist letters or DMCA-based takedown to shut down these projects. Full Screen Mario, a web browser-based version of Super Mario Bros., was shut down in 2013 after Nintendo issued a cease and desist letter. Other notable fan projects that have been taken down include Pokémon Uranium, a fan game based on the Pokémon series in 2016, Super Mario 64 Online, an online multiplayer version of Super Mario 64 in 2017, and Metroid Prime 2D, a demake of Metroid Prime, in 2021. Nintendo has defended these actions as necessary to protect its intellectual property, stating that "Nintendo respects the intellectual property rights of others", but also that they want to protect characters, trademarks and other content in regards to their established franchises. In some cases, the developers of these fan games have repurposed their work into new projects. In the case of No Mario's Sky, a mashup of Super Mario Bros. and No Man's Sky, after Nintendo sought to terminate the project, the Mario content was stripped and the game was renamed as DMCA's Sky.

In 2016, Nintendo issued DMCA takedowns for hundreds of fan games hosted on the platform Game Jolt, as well as others off-site, such as the unofficial Metroid II remake, AM2R. This followed another takedown request for AM2R issued earlier that year. Two of the affected games, Pokémon Uranium and AM2R, had been nominated for The Game Awards that year, and were subsequently removed. Later the same year, Pokémon Prism was also shut down. In 2020, an in-development Mother 3 fan sequel previously dubbed Mother 4 was renamed Oddity, and its references to the series removed, in order to prevent the game from being taken down. In 2021, Nintendo of America's legal team issued a mass DMCA takedown of 379 games removed out from Game Jolt. Many of the games' developers and fans have been taken it by surprise, although Nintendo's mention of advertisement revenue being used on the games' page made the reasoning behind the takedowns. An "ambitious" Metroid-based fan game, Metroid Prime 2D, which had been in development for 15 years, was taken down by Nintendo in August 2021, four months after a demo was released.

Nintendo has also taken action against mods that bring Nintendo property into third-party games, notably seeking to block a Pokemon-based mod for the game Palworld, itself which has been colloquially described as a "Pokemon with guns" game. Nintendo issued a statement that they plan to investigate not only the mod but the game for potential copyright misuse. In March 2024, former lawyer of The Pokémon Company Don McGowan interviewed with Aftermath about his time working at Bungie and the company. McGowan also discussed about the company's approach to cease and desist and point out that there were many discussions about the 2024 video game Palworld due to its similarity to the Pokémon franchise. Around the same month, Relic Castle, an unofficial Pokémon forum website has been taken offline after being allegedly received a DMCA takedown notice. The details of the alleged notice haven't been confirmed, so as if the takedown comes directly from The Pokémon Company. GamesRadar+ and VG247 noted it likely due to the fan games that were shared in the website, although the website didn't host the games directly. In April, the sandbox game Garry's Mod received copyright takedown requests from Nintendo to remove all of the downloadable content that infringe Nintendo copyright. The game's creator Garry Newman made a post telling users that they may have noticed certain Nintendo-related contents removed. While Garry's Mod began removing Nintendo-related contents, some users believed the requests were from a troll, but Newman confirmed that he was assured that the takedown requests were legitimate.

=== List of fan game takedowns ===
- April 2010: Takedown of Pokemon MMO Pokenet.
- March 2015: Takedown of fan made remake of Super Mario 64 titled Super Mario 64 HD.
- May 2015: Takedown of The Legend of Zelda Ocarina of Time 2D, a fan remake of Ocarina of Time in the style of A Link to the Past.
- April 2016: Takedown of Zelda tribute game Zelda30Tribute.
- August 2016: Discontinuation of AM2R, an unofficial remake of Metroid II.
- August 2016: Takedown of Pokémon fan game Pokémon Uranium.
- May 2016: Takedown of website and GitHub source code for Full Screen Mario, a web-based recreation of Super Mario Bros.
- November 2016: AM2R and Pokémon Uranium have "Best Fan Creation" nominations revoked from The Game Awards.
- December 2016: Pokémon fan hack Pokemon Prism receives cease and desist four days before release.
- December 2020: Removal of 379 fan games from Game Jolt.
- January 2022: Removing videos of Second Wind mod for The Legend of Zelda: Breath of the Wild.
- January 2022: Removal of YouTube videos for fan-made Pokémon first person shooter.
- January 2024: DMCA takedown of Palworld mod to add Pokémon.
- March 2024: Pokémon fan game site Relic Castle receives DMCA takedown.
- April 2024: DMCA takedown of Nintendo-related Steam Workshop content for Garry's Mod.
- May 2024: DMCA takedown of a Rhythm Heaven fan-game called Heaven Studio unofficial revival.

=== Reception ===
Despite acknowledging that these takedowns are within Nintendo's rights, critics have argued that Nintendo should set guidelines and policies on fan content in a similar vein as other major publishers, such as Riot Games, Bethesda Softworks, Valve, Rockstar, and Sega, in order to maintain fan goodwill and allow for free expression. While former Nintendo president Satoru Iwata expressed interest in adopting such guidelines in 2010, Nintendo has since maintained a hardline stance, removing anything remotely popular that might infringe upon a Nintendo copyright. Despite Nintendo's assertions that they are protecting their copyright, their common takedowns of free, not-for-profit games have been described as legally unnecessary, as they are normally used as a "last line of defense" against those seeking to profit from another's IP.

In 2016, Sean Buckley of Engadget remarked on the takedown of 500 games. While noting that Nintendo was "within its right to put a lid on these fan projects", he called the takedowns "always a bummer". He described the removed games as "passionate fan works", and AM2R as "lovingly crafted". Kyle Orland of Ars Technica remarked on this as well, saying that while cease-and-desist letters were nothing new in the gaming industry, Nintendo's stance was "wide-ranging" and "hardline". Jon Partridge of Red Bull said that while most of the removed games would "not be missed", several of the removed games were nevertheless "amazing", such as Pokémon Uranium and AM2R.

In 2017, Owen S. Good of Polygon argued that creating and sharing fan games was a "significant part of gaming culture" that could not be denied or shut down by publishers, despite Nintendo's attempts to do so. Using the example of Breath of the NES, a 2D fan-made demake of The Legend of Zelda: Breath of the Wild, he highlighted that any creators making fan games based on Nintendo IP expected to be shut down, forcing creators to remove any Nintendo references. While many fans adopted the position that fan games should not be advertised until they were released, allowing for "underground" distribution, this would be completely untenable for many fan game creators, who would receive no player feedback or motivation to continue development. Stephen McArthur, the "video game lawyer", was interviewed for the piece, and noted that most major publishers had rules for fan-created content that incorporates their IP. He stated that, while publishers reserve the right to shut something down for any reason, blanket prohibitions on fan works are "legally unnecessary and also a terrible business and marketing policy". He also noted that Nintendo's repeated takedowns had no proactive effect, as they did not stop further fan works from being created, while at the same time angering fans. Developers simply assume that they will be caught and proceed with making the game anyway.

In 2019, Luke Plunkett of Kotaku said that Nintendo's copyright takedowns were so "predictable and tragic" that they had become an Internet meme, noting that Nintendo was disproportionately focused on removing fan games, while ignoring fan art, music, etc. While saying that Nintendo's lawyers have a "job to do" and that they should not be blamed, he still expressed his opinion that "the letter of the law can and does suck", and that the company was failing to distinguish between "things that are trying to steal from them" and "homages to their legacy". He described Nintendo's response at the time as "almost algorithmic" and "ruthless" in "shutting down even the most innocuous projects". He highlighted Nintendo's former Creator's Program for YouTube videos as an example to emulate in the fan game realm, and said that, even outside Nintendo's legal departments, many in Nintendo, such as employees at Game Freak, enjoyed seeing fan games. He also noted that Installation 01, a Halo fan game, had reached a deal with Microsoft to continue development, saying that such things could be possible with Nintendo fan games as well.

== Copyright and patent infringement ==
In recent years, Nintendo has taken legal action against sites that knowingly distribute ROM images of its games. In July 2018, Nintendo sued Jacob Mathias, the owner of distribution websites LoveROMs and LoveRetro, for "brazen and mass-scale infringement of Nintendo's intellectual property rights". Nintendo settled with Mathias that November for more than US$12 million along with relinquishing all ROM images in their ownership. While Nintendo is likely to have agreed to a smaller fine in private, the large amount was seen as a deterrent to prevent similar sites from sharing ROM images. Nintendo won a separate suit against RomUniverse in May 2021, which also offered infringing copies of Nintendo DS and Switch games in addition to ROM images. The site owner was required to pay Nintendo $2.1 million in damages, and later given a permanent injunction preventing the site from operating in the future and requiring the owner to destroy all ROM copies. Nintendo successfully won a suit in the United Kingdom in September 2019 to force the major Internet service providers in the country to block access to sites that offered copyright-infringing copies of Switch software or hacks for the Nintendo Switch to run unauthorized software. Nintendo successfully won copyright suits filed in French courts over the file sharing site Dstorage for failing to remove copies of Nintendo game ROMs that had been added by users.

Nintendo also took steps to use a DMCA strike to block a video segment by the YouTube channel Did You Know Gaming? covering an uncompleted Zelda game pitched to Nintendo by Retro Studios, though the channel later succeeded in reversing the strike. When leaks related to The Legend of Zelda: Tears of the Kingdom appeared online in the week before the game's release in May 2023, Nintendo sent out DMCA takedown requests to several tools related to Switch emulation in attempts to stop the leaks.

Nintendo also has a large patent portfolio related to its hardware and software which it also defends. Nintendo along with The Pokémon Company filed a patent infringement lawsuit in September 2024 against Pocketpair over Palworld, with Nintendo claiming the game violated multiple patents it owns. Pocketpair has defended their game, among their arguments that existing game mods exhibit prior art to the patents. Nintendo had argued that such mods cannot be prior art, since they require the base game to run and cannot be considered novel themselves. The U.S. Patent Office issued an ex parte reexamination of one of the key patents in Nintendo's case based on two prior patents, one from Nintendo themselves and another by Konami filed in 2002. In a rare move in March 2026, the Patent Office revoked all claims in one of the Nintendo patents at the center of this case, on summoning monsters into battle. Nintendo can appeal this decision.

== User-made video content ==
Prior to 2010, technology allowed users to record and upload videos of themselves playing games, such as in Let's Play formats, to sites like YouTube. In 2013, Nintendo became a YouTube Partner, registering their content into YouTube's databases as to allow YouTube's Content ID system to automatically flag videos that used their copyrighted content. This allowed Nintendo to claim monetization of videos that used large portions of their content, but also impacted Let's Play videos, whose fair-use status under U.S. copyright law is legally uncertain. Due to negative feedback from players, Nintendo backed off this policy and established a Nintendo Creators program in May 2014, which allows registered users to still produce such videos with ad revenue split between the creator, YouTube, and Nintendo. As Nintendo had requested as much as 40% of such revenues, the program became more controversial and Nintendo ended the Creators program in November 2018, instead establishing guidelines that user-creator videos should use to assure their works expand beyond just showing footage of Nintendo's video games. Nintendo expanded these guidelines in September 2024, stating that the company would object to any user-created videos using Nintendo content that were "unlawful, infringing, or inappropriate". That same month, Nintendo issued two copyright strikes against the YouTube channel Retro Game Corps; one for demonstrating the Mig Flash cartridge, and another for showing Wii U emulation on Android.

RTA, a fan-run Japanese speedrunning contest held for charity, had used Nintendo games among others as part of their event since its inception in 2016. Ahead of the RTA's 2025 event, Nintendo sent a legal demand that RTA stop using Nintendo games as part of the event, and after negotiations with RTA, agreed that RTA can request to use Nintendo games on a game-by-game basis. While Nintendo did not specify the reason for this change, followers of the event theorized that due to increase in size and sponsorship for RTA, Nintendo became concerned about the representation of its games, according to IGN.

== Data breaches ==
Nintendo sought enforcement action against a hacker that for several years had infiltrated Nintendo's internal database by various means including phishing to obtain plans for games and hardware for upcoming shows like E3. This was leaked to the Internet, impacting how Nintendo's own announcements were received. Though the person was a minor when Nintendo brought the United States Federal Bureau of Investigation (FBI) to investigate, and had been warned by the FBI to desist, the person continued over 2018 and 2019 as an adult, posting taunts on social media. The perpetrator was arrested in July 2019, and the FBI found documents confirming the hacks, many unauthorized game files, and child pornography, leading to the perpetrator's admission of guilt for all crimes in January 2020 and was sentenced to three years in prison. Similarly, Nintendo alongside The Pokémon Company spent significant time to identify who had leaked information about Pokémon Sword and Shield several weeks before its planned Nintendo Directs, ultimately tracing the leaks back to a Portugal game journalist who leaked the information from official review copies of the game and subsequently severed ties with the publication.

=== Nintendo data leak ===
In 2020, two major leaks of documents occurred. The first leak began in May, and it included source code, designs, hardware drawings, documentation, and other internal information primarily related to the Nintendo 64, GameCube, and Wii. The leak may have been related to BroadOn, a company that Nintendo had contracted to help with the Wii's design, or to Zammis Clark, a Malwarebytes employee and hacker who pleaded guilty to infiltrating Microsoft's and Nintendo's servers between March and May 2018. A second and larger leak occurred in July, which has been called the "Gigaleak" as it contains gigabytes of data, and is believed to be related to the leak from May. The leak includes the source code and prototypes for several early 1990s Super NES games including Super Mario Kart, Yoshi's Island, Star Fox, and Star Fox 2, and includes internal development tools and system software components. The veracity of the material was confirmed by Dylan Cuthbert, a programmer for Nintendo during that period. The leak has the source code to several Nintendo 64 games including Super Mario 64 and The Legend of Zelda: Ocarina of Time, and the console's operating system. The leak contains personal files from Nintendo employees.

== See also ==
- List of unofficial Mario media
