= Ryujinx =

Discontinued Nintendo Switch emulator

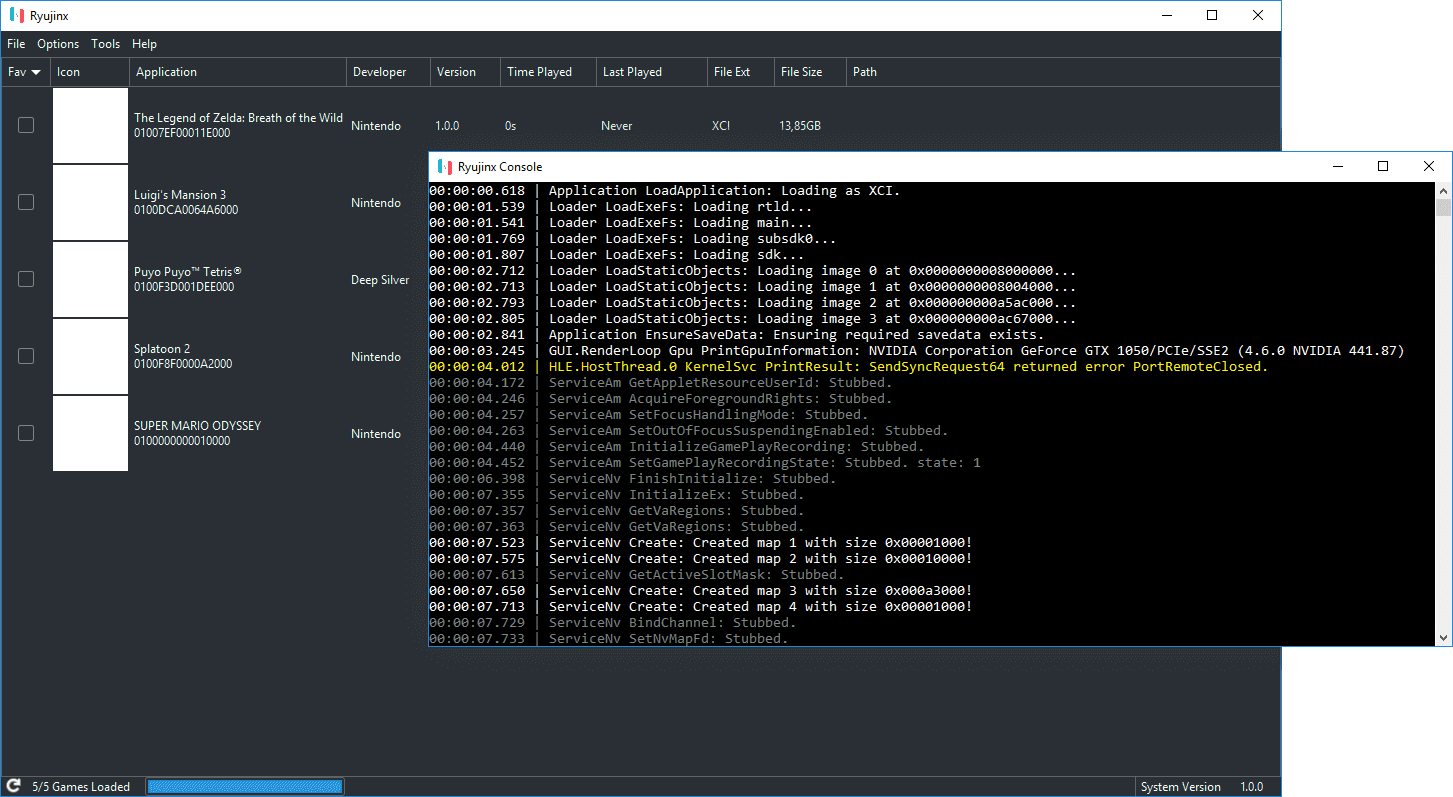
- Main UI of Ryujinx, running on Windows
- Original author: gdkchan
- Developer: Ryujinx team
- Release: February 5, 2018; 8 years ago
- Final release: 1.1.1403 / October 1, 2024; 23 months ago
- Written in: C#
- Operating system: Windows; Linux; macOS
- Platform: x86-64, ARM64
- Type: Video game console emulator
- License: MIT License
- Website: https://ryujinx.org at the Wayback Machine (archived October 10, 2024)
- Repository: https://github.com/Ryujinx/Ryujinx at Ghost Archive (archived October 1, 2024)

Ryujinx is a discontinued free and open-source emulator of the Nintendo Switch. It was first released on February 5, 2018 and supported more than 3,000 games by 2024.

On October 1, 2024, Ryujinx pulled its source code from GitHub, and the project was shut down after a request from Nintendo.

== Features ==
Ryujinx features an accurate recreation of the Nintendo Switch's Maxwell GPU. It supports the Nintendo Switch's docked and handheld modes in addition to resolution scaling beyond those supported by the original hardware.

Ryujinx supports multiplayer through its LDN network, allowing games to be played between multiple users of the emulator. As of the release of LDN3 players with a modded physical Nintendo Switch can play with others on the LDN network.

According to the developers in May 2024, more than 3,550 games were playable on Ryujinx out of 4,300 titles tested, with 4,100 being able to boot past menus and into gameplay.

== Development ==
Initially starting out as an ARM64 emulator in October of 2017, Ryujinx development began in December of 2017. Written in C#, it was the first Switch emulator to boot commercial games. In April 2018, it was reported that it was initially able to play part of Cave Story and Puyo Puyo Tetris. According to the creator, gdkchan, Ryujinx had a focus on correctness, rather than adding game-specific hacks as is practiced by some console emulators. Development of Ryujinx was funded via Patreon, with 800 members contributing $1,661 a month as of October 1, 2024.

On July 31, 2022, Ryujinx announced a new backend for the Vulkan graphics API, resulting in significant performance improvements of up to 413% in some titles, over the original OpenGL backend.

On November 26, 2022, Ryujinx announced a macOS port, becoming the first Nintendo Switch emulator to arrive on the platform. The port takes advantage of the hypervisor present on Apple silicon hardware to run the ARMv8 code of the Nintendo Switch natively, unlocking significant performance benefits, as compared to standard emulation.

On March 2, 2024, Ryujinx made the transition from a GTK based GUI to one made in the C# native framework, Avalonia.

In the post announcing the project's end on October 1, 2024, developers revealed internal projects to bring Ryujinx to iOS and Android. These projects were not publicly released.

== Discontinuation ==
On October 1, 2024 Ryujinx's GitHub page was taken down. A moderator of Ryujinx's Discord server wrote that "Yesterday, gdkchan was contacted by Nintendo and offered an agreement to stop working on the project, remove the organization and all related assets he's in control of. While awaiting confirmation on whether he would take this agreement, the organization has been removed, so I think it's safe to say what the outcome is." It was not clear if the agreement offered by Nintendo included monetary compensation, with PC Gamer noting that it was unlikely.

== Reception ==
On April 25, 2023, Ryujinx was featured in PC Gamer alongside now-discontinued open-source emulator Yuzu ahead of the release of The Legend of Zelda: Tears of the Kingdom. Following the release of the game, PC Gamer released a follow-up article on a number of fixes implemented to improve emulation.

Following the release of The Legend of Zelda: Echoes of Wisdom on September 26, 2024, Ryujinx was noted by multiple outlets as being capable of running the title at a high frame rate.

== See also ==
- Nintendo Switch emulation
