= Nintendo Switch emulation =

Video game console emulation software

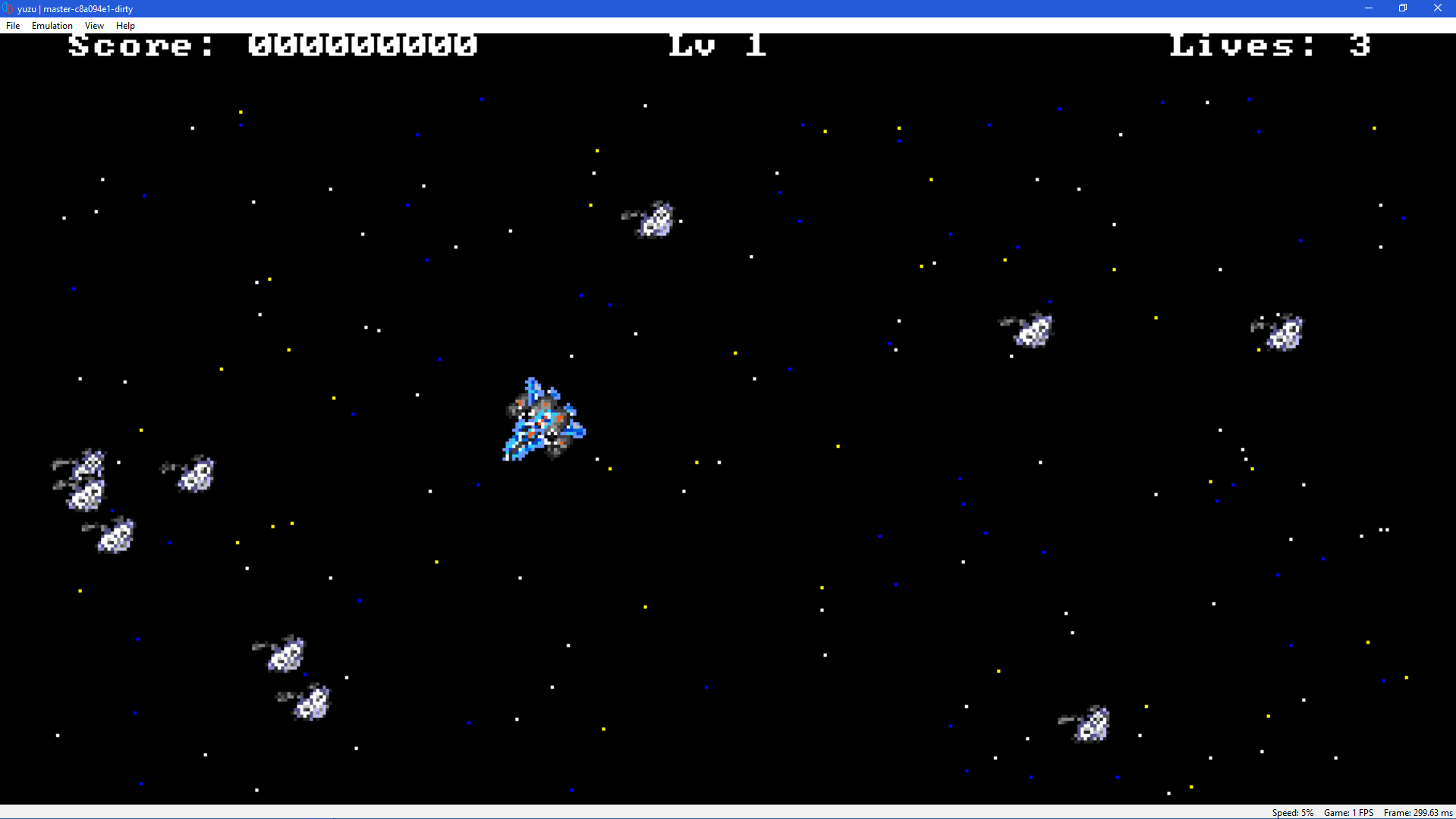
Yuzu emulator running a homebrew game on Windows 10

Emulators of the Nintendo Switch, Nintendo's eighth-generation video game console, have been in development since 2017, less than a year after the console's release. Multiple emulators have been in development, the most well-known being Yuzu and Ryujinx, both now defunct. Switch emulators have been widely noted by video games journalists for the swift and significant progress of their abilities to accurately emulate the console, as they are already able to run existing and new titles for the console in a playable state, sometimes within days of their release, as well as able to run on a variety of devices, including PCs running Windows and Linux, and the Steam Deck.

The coverage and development of the emulators has attracted notable attention from the industry, including Nintendo, as well as Denuvo Software Solutions GmbH which, at the request of publishing companies partnered with them concerned about piracy, has developed a digital rights management measure intended to prevent play of emulated Switch games.

== Emulators ==
In March 2017, it was reported that claims of a functioning Nintendo Switch emulator had spread online via YouTube videos and fraudulent postings on GitHub. These claims were in fact scams intended to trick victims into downloading data stealing malware. This attracted attention from the Federal Trade Commission, which advised the public that no such software existed and that the only way to play Nintendo Switch games was on the real actual system. Yuzu became the first Switch emulator in 2018.

=== Discontinued ===
==== Ryujinx ====
Logo of Ryujinx

Ryujinx, written in C#, was the first Switch emulator to boot commercial games. In April 2018, it was reported that it was initially able to play part of Cave Story. According to the creator, gdkchan, Ryujinx has a focus on correctness, rather than adding game-specific hacks as is done by some console emulators. Ryujinx has both a Vulkan and OpenGL backend. As of February 2022, about 3,400 games are playable on Ryujinx. Ryujinx is open source and is funded via Patreon. On October 1, 2024, Ryujinx pulled its source code from GitHub, and the project was reportedly shut down after a request from Nintendo.

==== Skyline ====
Skyline was an experimental Switch emulator for Android devices, which was initially capable of playing Sonic Mania, Celeste, and parts of Super Mario Odyssey.

==== Yuzu ====
Logo of Yuzu

Yuzu (sometimes stylized in lowercase) is a discontinued free and open-source emulator of the Nintendo Switch, developed in C++. Yuzu was announced to be in development on January 14, 2018, less than a year after the Switch's release. The emulator was made by the developers of the Nintendo 3DS emulator Citra, with significant code shared between the projects. The emulator briefly supported online functionality, but it was removed shortly thereafter.

On March 4, 2024, due to a settlement in the court of law between Yuzu developers and Nintendo of America, the project has been officially shut down, and currently it is impossible to download Yuzu from official sources.

== Media coverage ==
In October 2018, Kotaku published an article noting that Super Mario Odyssey was playable in Yuzu. The author of the article expressed concern with the ability of Yuzu to emulate games that were available commercially at the time.

PC Gamer noted that Yuzu was able to run Pokémon: Let's Go, Pikachu! and Let's Go, Eevee! shortly after the games' release, albeit with audio issues.

In October 2019, Gizmodo published an article noting that Yuzu was able to emulate some games at a frame rate roughly on par with the actual console hardware.

In September 2020, Nintendo Life published an article saying that a The Legend of Zelda: Breath of the Wild mod worked on Ryujinx and other emulators.

In October 2021, multiple outlets reported that Metroid Dread was able to be played on both Yuzu and Ryujinx within days of its release. Ryujinx was reportedly capable of running Dread at 4K resolution, higher than the Switch could. Kotaku initially opined that this improved the look of the game significantly. However, the article was significantly revised shortly after publication, removing this mention.

Since 2022, various outlets have reported that Yuzu can run on the Steam Deck.

== Industry response ==
Initial (left) and current (right) revisions of an article from Kotaku covering Switch emulators that successfully ran Metroid Dread; the article was revised after Kotaku received a complaint from Nintendo.

On October 9, 2021, Kotaku published an article stating that Metroid Dread was running "great" on Yuzu and Ryujinx, adding that "you can play Dread on your computer, right now", and including several positive mentions of video game piracy, thanking "pirates, emulators, modders, and hackers" and suggesting readers emulate older or expensive games themselves. After receiving criticism, Kotaku revised the article to clarify they were referring to emulation in video game preservation and, following a complaint from Nintendo, removed all mentions of piracy from the article and issued an apology for its initial failure to meet their editorial standards, adding that they had not intended to suggest that players should pirate video games. Noelle Warner of Destructoid, while saying that Kotaku had "basically told players to download an emulation of Metroid Dread", also noted the response to Kotaku on social media had rekindled discussion about the role of emulators in game preservation projects.

After the publicization of Yuzu's ability to run on the Steam Deck, several YouTube videos providing guidance on how to do so were taken down. Though it was not known who had issued the takedowns, outlets reporting on the news believed that it was Nintendo, given their past history of issuing DMCA takedown notices against unofficial content creators. A promotional video released by Valve in October 2022 briefly displayed Yuzu's icon in a Steam Deck's home menu, but the video was later taken down and reuploaded after being edited to remove this.

On August 24, 2022, Denuvo Software Solutions GmbH announced that they had developed "Nintendo Switch Emulator Protection", a new digital rights management measure for Nintendo Switch titles intended to block play of emulated games. Nintendo Switch owners on social media widely criticized the announcement of this software, expressing concerns that it would hinder software performance, citing Denuvo DRM's history of being reported as impacting PC gaming performance. However, Denuvo said in statements to the press that it would not negatively impact performance of Switch games for those playing on real console hardware. Denuvo declined to disclose the names of any other companies involved, but said that Nintendo was not involved and that there had been "strong demand" from software publishers for such an anti-piracy measure. The developers of Ryujinx responded to the announcement in a tweet, stating their intention to continue developing the software.

In November 2022, Nintendo filed several DMCA takedown notices against the website SteamGridDB, which hosts a collection of video game images intended for use as custom-set header and cover images of non-Steam games imported into users' personal Steam libraries. GamesRadar and Nintendo Life suggested that these notices, which were specifically aimed at recent or particularly notable titles such as Breath of the Wild, Pokémon Scarlet and Violet, and Xenoblade Chronicles 3, were issued with the intent to discourage users from playing those games on their PCs or Steam Deck devices via emulation software. Dustin Bailey of GamesRadar characterized this action by the company as curious, considering both that SteamGridDB only hosts images and not any pirated copies of games, and images of many other Switch-exclusive games were hosted on the site. Bailey therefore concluded, "It simply seems Nintendo is taking whatever strange, small steps it can to keep its biggest Switch games from being associated with Steam or the Steam Deck."

On February 27, 2024, Nintendo filed a lawsuit against Tropic Haze LLC, the legal entity behind Yuzu. Later, on March 4, 2024, Tropic Haze settled their lawsuit with Nintendo for $2.4 million, and took down the source code, Patreon, Discord, and website for Yuzu as well as a Nintendo 3DS emulator created by the same company called Citra. In June 2024, Nintendo filed a lawsuit against James Williams, who had been involved in operating a piracy network of Nintendo Switch games on the SwitchPirates Reddit online community. Later in November, Nintendo submitted a court filing that sought information of the people who worked with Williams on Reddit, Discord, and GitHub. The company demanded permission to deliver subpoenas on the individuals.

== See also ==
- Game Genie
- Intellectual property protection by Nintendo
- Mig Flash
