= Flash card =

Flash card may refer to:

- Flashcard, a set of cards with words etc. on them, used for education and training
- Memory card, electronic data storage, a form of flash memory
- Flash cartridge, for a video game console, programmable by a consumer, often for homemade or copied games
