= R4 cartridge =

Flash cartridge for the Nintendo DS video game systems

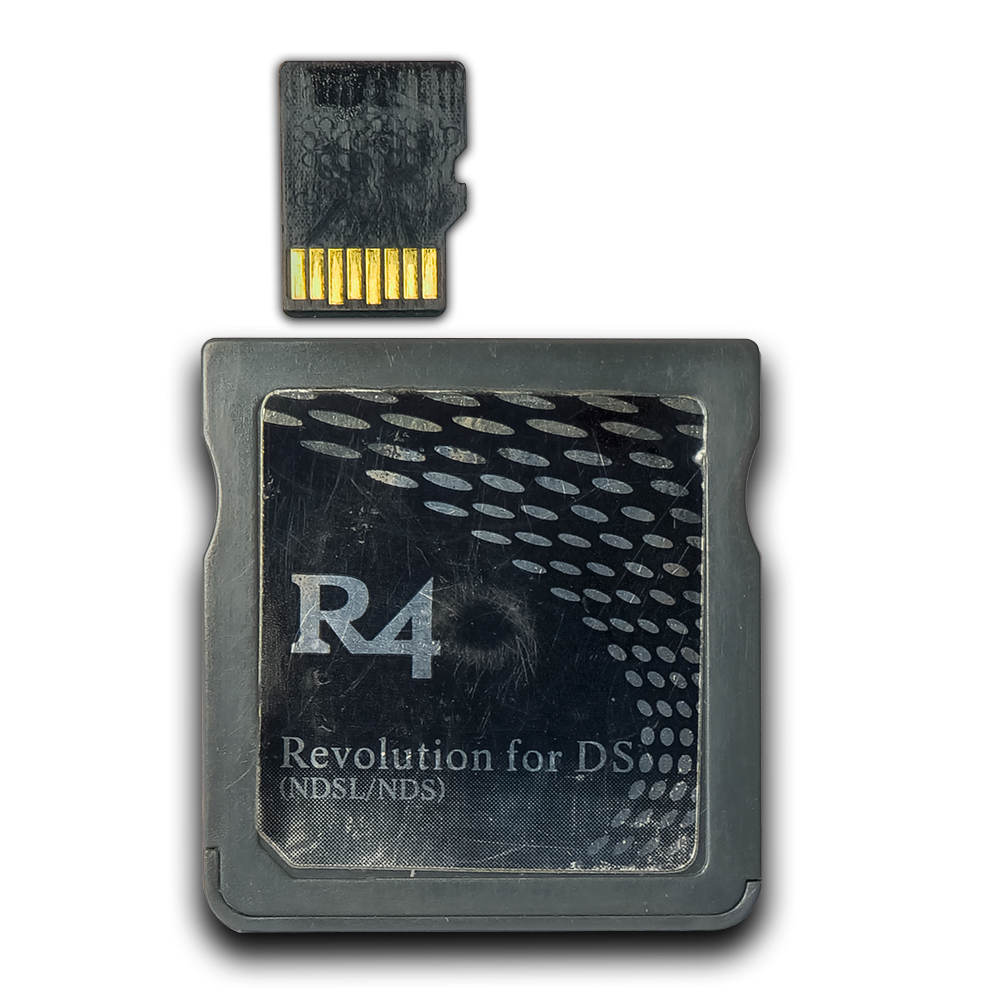
- The original R4 flashcard from 2007, with a microSD card
- Also known as: Revolution for DS
- Developer: R4 Team
- Type: Flash cartridge
- Released: 2007
- Discontinued: Yes; date undisclosed
- Website: www.r4ds.com(May 2008)

R4 (also known as Revolution for DS) is an unlicensed flash cartridge for the Nintendo DS handheld system developed by the R4 Team. It allows ROMs and homebrew to be booted on the Nintendo DS handheld system from a microSD card. This allows the user to run homebrew applications, to store multiple games and MP3 music files on a single memory card, and to play games that have been backed up or downloaded by the user.

The R4 Team stopped production of the original R4 cartridge. However, due to the popularity of the original R4 there are many other Nintendo DS flashcards using the R4 name despite the lack of any connection to the original. Some of these cartridges can also store a 3DS boot image; a 3DS can in turn be made to boot from the cartridge by way of an undocumented button combination recognized by the system's bootloader. Since the 3DS's secure boot signature validation has been broken, this provides a useful means of installing custom firmware on a 3DS.

== Original cards ==
The original R4 cards use a microSD (≤2GB, FAT32) card for its firmware and games, and does not support SDHC microSD cards. The original Revolution for DS card is no longer sold. However, cards commonly referred to as 1:1 clones can still be purchased online. These flashcards use exactly the same hardware as the original R4 cartridge.

== Legal issues ==
R4 flash cartridges are banned in some countries due to copyright infringement lawsuits from Nintendo. In late 2007, Nintendo began a legal crackdown with a series of raids against R4 merchants.

=== United Kingdom ===
In 2010, the company Playables Limited, importers of R4 flashcards, was ruled against by the London High Court. The ruling outlawed any sales, importation, or advertising of the R4 flashcards. The defence of Playables Limited claimed that the R4 flashcards were legal because it uses a homebrew application. However, bypassing Nintendo's security system is against the law in the United Kingdom. After the news broke, Nintendo released a statement saying that they do support game developers that create their own applications legitimately. 100,000 copying devices including R4s were seized in 2009. Nintendo claimed that the cards were not only seized for the benefit of their own company, but for the benefit of over 1,400 video game companies that depend on the sales of their games.

=== France ===
In October 2011, the R4 cards were banned in France. While Nintendo's original lawsuit was dismissed on the basis that the devices could be used to make homebrews and develop software in 2009, the 2011 ruling reversed this, and the Paris court of appeals ruled against five R4 sellers and distributors. The sellers and distributors were fined over €460,000, and some were sentenced to jail. Stephan Bole, the managing director of Nintendo France released a statement saying "Nintendo supported this criminal action not only for the company’s sake, but for the interests of its game developer partners who spend time and money legitimately developing software for Nintendo’s game platforms, and customers who expect the highest standards and integrity from products bearing the Nintendo name."

=== Japan ===
In 2009, the government of Japan outlawed the sales of the R4 flashcard. In 2012, the Japanese Ministry of Economy, Trade, and Industry revealed that the importing of R4 cards, and similar devices, is now punishable by law. In 2013, Nintendo won a court case against two R4 card distributors in Japan. The Tokyo district court ruled that the sellers of the R4 cards owed Nintendo and 49 other video game developers ¥95,625,000.

=== Germany ===
In 2009, Nintendo lost a lawsuit against a seller of flashcards, however Nintendo won the second and final instance. Since December 2014, flashcards are officially illegal due to Germany's copyright law. The seller and distributor of the R4 flashcards was fined over €1 million. However, using the R4 card only for private use is not illegal in Germany, only the use of pirated software is illegal.

=== Italy ===
In 2009, Nintendo started a lawsuit against a seller of flashcards, which lasted three instances and ended only in 2017 with the sentence of the seller, however the punishment is undisclosed. Curiously, in another trial held in 2016 Court of Catania declared flashcards legal since they have been exchanged for microSD-to-DScart adapters, citing the fact the R4 is not able to run any copyrighted code without a kernel, which is not sold with the flashcard, and the hardware-embedded protection breaking functionalities were considered legitimate to run unsigned code.

=== Other countries ===
Other countries that have banned the R4 flashcards include Australia, Belgium, the Netherlands, and South Korea.

== See also ==
- Nintendo DS and 3DS storage devices
