= Russ Crandall =

American YouTuber and former food blogger (born 1980)

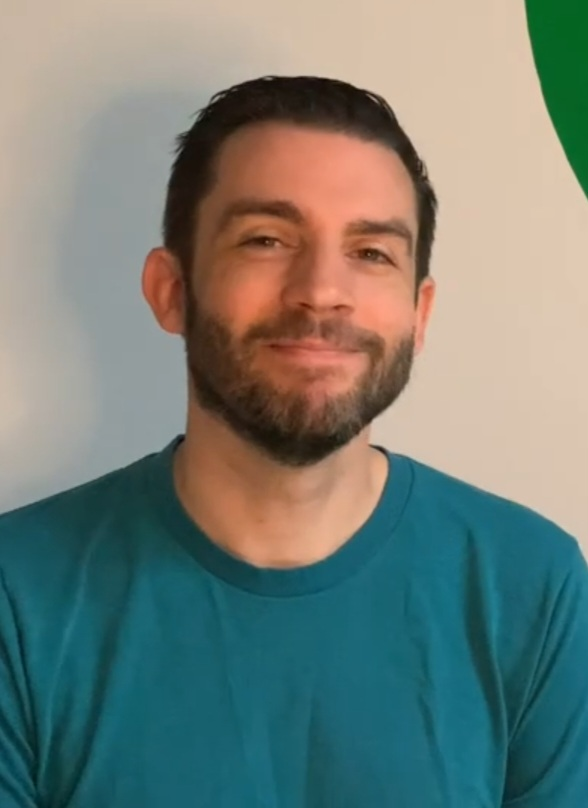
- Crandall in 2024
- Born: Russell Crandall; February 24, 1980 (age 46); Washington state, U.S.
- Occupations: YouTuber; Podcaster; Food blogger (former); Food writer (former)

YouTube information
- Channel: Retro Game Corps
- Years active: 2020–present
- Genre: Handheld game consoles
- Subscribers: 877 thousand
- Views: 213 million
- Last updated: November 17, 2026

Russell "Russ" Crandall (born February 24, 1980) is an American YouTuber, podcaster, and former food blogger and writer. He became known for the gluten-free and paleo diet blog The Domestic Man, which he ran from 2010 to 2023, and later for the handheld console YouTube channel Retro Game Corps, created in 2020.

Crandall joined the United States Navy in 2000 as a Russian and Indonesian translator. In 2005, he suffered a stroke and was later diagnosed with Takayasu's arteritis, which led him to adopt a paleo diet and create The Domestic Man in 2010. Crandall published cookbooks such as The Ancestral Table (2014) and Paleo Takeout (2015), the latter becoming a New York Times Best Seller.

In 2020, he launched Retro Game Corps, a YouTube channel focused on handheld consoles. In 2023, he retired from the Navy and closed The Domestic Man to pursue a full-time YouTube career. Since 2026, he co-hosts the PC World podcast Expedition: Handheld.

== Biography ==
Russell Crandall was born February 24, 1980, in Washington state, United States. His first job was at a Burger King at the age of 16, and he worked at different restaurants for four years.

=== United States Navy ===
In 2000, Crandall joined the United States Navy as a cryptologic technician (interpretive), working as a Navy translator fluent in Russian and Indonesian. In 2015, he was promoted to Master Chief Petty Officer in that role. He retired in 2023.

=== The Domestic Man ===
In 2005, Crandall suffered a stroke and needed to go through physical therapy to relearn how to walk and write. The next year, he was diagnosed with Takayasu's arteritis, an autoimmune disease characterized by the inflammation and narrowing of the arteries. He underwent open heart surgery in an attempt to alleviate his symptoms, which was unsuccessful. In 2010, Crandall came across the book The Paleo Solution by Robb Wolf, which claims the paleo diet could help with autoimmune disease. Crandall began adhering to the diet; according to him, his symptoms improved within weeks. That same year, he created the blog The Domestic Man, focusing on the paleo and gluten-free diets and posting weekly recipes.

In 2013, The Domestic Man was nominated for Best Special Diets Blog at the Saveur Best Food Blog Awards, and Mashable listed it among the best food accounts to follow on Instagram. That same year, one of Crandall's recipes was featured on People magazine. In 2014, Crandall published his first cookbook, The Ancestral Table, containing over a hundred recipes from around the world. He also released the e-book The Safe Starch Cookbook, which he updated until 2017. In 2015, Crandall released another cookbook, Paleo Takeout, and toured in support of it. In August, it entered the New York Times Best Sellers list for the "Food and Fitness" category, and later appeared in Amazon's list of the best books of the year. Saveur listed Crandall among the best Instagram food accounts of 2016. He released his final cookbook, The Heritage Cookbook, in 2019. Crandall had also contributed to Kitchen Daily, Food & Wine, and Yahoo! Food, with recipes featured in The Huffington Post, BuzzFeed, and Mashable. He closed The Domestic Man in 2023.

=== Retro Game Corps ===
Our Ghosts – "My First Day at the Retro Game Corps"
Retro Game Corps's theme song since 2022

In 2020, Crandall created the YouTube channel Retro Game Corps focused on handheld game consoles, especially those for retro gaming and emulation, with content including hardware reviews and guides. Crandall began the channel as a hobby during the COVID-19 pandemic, a time when handheld consoles grew in popularity. In 2023, he retired from the Navy and closed The Domestic Man to pursue a full-time YouTube career. That year, he contributed to A Handheld History, a book by the Retro Dodo website about the history of gaming handhelds. In September 2024, Nintendo issued two copyright strikes against the channel; one for demonstrating the Mig Flash cartridge, and another for showing Wii U emulation on an Android device.

On February 28, 2026, Crandall began co-hosting Expedition: Handheld, a podcast by PC World's The Full Nerd Network about handheld consoles, alongside the magazine's Adam Patrick Murray.

== Personal life ==
Crandall holds a master's degree in healthcare administration from Walden University, a Bachelor of Arts in social studies from Chaminade University of Honolulu, and an Associate of Arts in Russian from the Defense Language Institute Foreign Language Center. He married in 2007. They had a son in 2009 and another in 2015. As of 2023, Crandall lives in Hawaii. He is a member of the band Oh the Possibilities.

== Books ==
- The Ancestral Table: Traditional Recipes for a Paleo Lifestyle (2014)
- The Safe Starch Cookbook (ebook; first published in 2014, updated until 2017)
- Paleo Takeout: Restaurant Favorites Without the Junk (2015)
- The Heritage Cookbook: 300+ Recipes to Help You Connect with Your Ancestry (2019)
