= Yuzu (emulator) =

Discontinued Nintendo Switch emulator

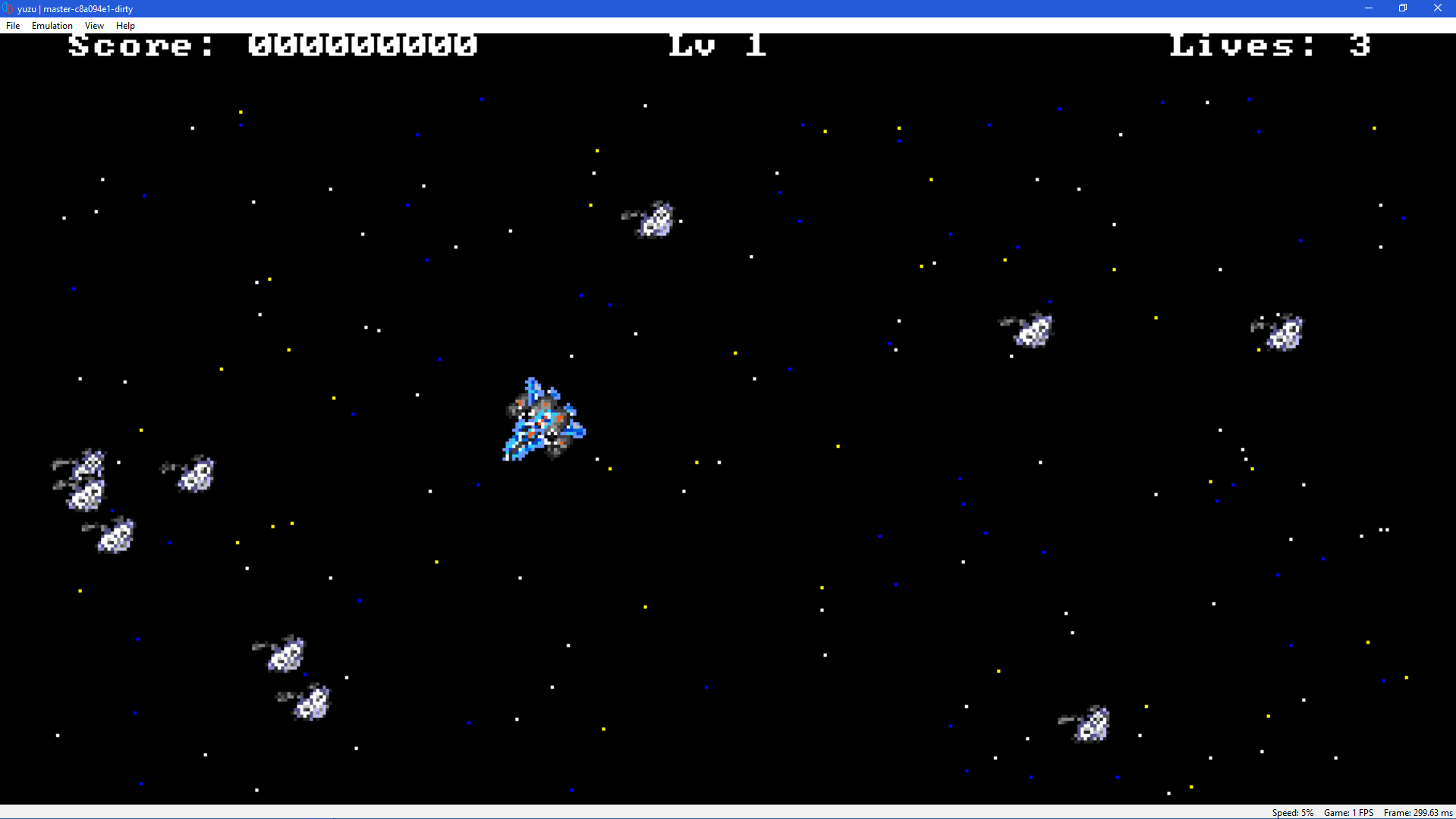
- Homebrew software running on Yuzu
- Release: January 14, 2018; 8 years ago
- Final release: Mainline 1734 / 4 March 2024; 2 years ago
- Preview release: Early Access 4176 / 1 March 2024; 2 years ago
- Written in: C++
- Operating system: Windows; Linux; Android
- Platform: x86-64; ARM64
- Type: Video game console emulator
- License: GPL-3.0-or-later
- Website: https://yuzu-emu.org at the Wayback Machine (archived March 4, 2024)
- Repository: https://github.com/yuzu-emu/yuzu at Ghost Archive (archived March 4, 2024)

Yuzu (sometimes stylized in lowercase) is a discontinued free and open-source emulator of the Nintendo Switch, developed in C++. Yuzu was announced to be in development on January 14, 2018, 10 months after the release of the Nintendo Switch.

The emulator was made by the developers of the Nintendo 3DS emulator Citra, with significant code shared between the projects. Originally, Yuzu only supported test programs and homebrew.

On February 26, 2024, Nintendo of America filed a lawsuit against Tropic Haze LLC, the legal entity behind Yuzu's development. Development and official distribution of Yuzu ceased on March 4, 2024, after Tropic Haze settled the lawsuit with Nintendo of America for $2.4 million.

== Features ==
Yuzu used a network service called Boxcat as a replacement for Nintendo's BCAT dynamic content network. This feature was later removed due to being non-functional. The implementation was planned to eventually be replaced with one that allows the use of local BCAT files dumped from a Nintendo Switch.

Yuzu also offered a resolution rescaling feature that simulates docked, undocked and beyond-native resolutions. After initially adding support for beyond-native resolution, the feature was removed again due to stability issues and inconsistent behaviour on different GPU vendors shortly after. Two years after the removal, the feature was finally readded under the codename "Project A.R.T".

In December 2019, Yuzu added an experimental Vulkan renderer to its Early Access build and brought it over to its mainline builds.

On May 9, 2020, the development team announced an update that included experimental multi-core CPU emulation codenamed Prometheus.

In November 2020, Yuzu's developers added online functionality to the emulator but removed it shortly thereafter.

In June 2021, Fastmem support was added to early access builds of Yuzu.

In July 2021, Yuzu concluded the "Project Hades", which aimed to rewrite the shader decompiler, bringing an improvement of the overall performance of the emulator.

In a statement to PC Gamer, the developers of Yuzu said that they were interested in potential optimizations to the emulator for use on the Steam Deck.

On May 30, 2023, an Android version was released.

Development ended on March 4, 2024, after Tropic Haze LLC, the legal entity representing Team Yuzu, settled a lawsuit with Nintendo of America, resulting in the shutdown of operations for both Yuzu and Citra emulators.

== Reception ==
In October 2018, Kotaku published an article noting that Super Mario Odyssey was playable. The author of the article expressed concern with the ability of Yuzu to emulate games that were available commercially at the time. This would eventually lead to a legal battle against Nintendo.

PC Gamer noted that the emulator was able to run Pokémon: Let's Go, Pikachu! and Let's Go, Eevee! shortly after the games' release, albeit with audio issues.

In October 2019, Gizmodo published an article noting that Yuzu was able to emulate some games at a frame rate roughly on par with the actual console hardware.

Since 2021, various outlets have reported that Yuzu can run on the Steam Deck, enabling play of Nintendo Switch games on the system.

Following the publication of a story by Kotaku on October 9, 2021, which covered the ability of both Yuzu and Ryujinx (another Switch emulator) to play Metroid Dread, Nintendo contacted the site's editorial team requesting a revision of the article, which was seen as encouraging piracy of the title. Kotaku responded by updating the article to remove language that was interpreted as such, and apologized to readers for the error. However, in an editorial addendum, they maintained that they believed emulation to be an important part of video game preservation efforts and that their coverage of the emulators did not equate to an encouragement to pirate the game.

After the publicization of Yuzu's ability to run on the Steam Deck, several YouTube videos providing guidance on how to do so were taken down. Though it was not known who had issued the takedowns, outlets reporting on the news believed that it was Nintendo, given their past history of issuing DMCA takedown notices against unofficial content creators.

On August 23, 2023, Denuvo announced that they had developed "Nintendo Switch Emulator Protection", a new digital rights management solution for Nintendo Switch titles which aims to allow developers to block play via emulators such as Yuzu.

On February 26, 2024, Nintendo of America filed a lawsuit against Tropic Haze LLC, the legal entity behind Team Yuzu.

On March 4, 2024, Tropic Haze LLC settled in their lawsuit with Nintendo of America for $2.4 million, leading to Yuzu shutting down its operations.

== Forks ==
On March 5, 2024, the Yuzu source code was forked by a different development team as "Suyu" (pronounced as "sue-you"; the name is also a tongue-in-cheek play on Nintendo's history of litigation). A contributor said, "Suyu currently exists in a legal gray area we are trying to work our way out of. There are multiple plans and possibilities for what to do next. Things are still being organized and planned." On March 21, 2024, after a DMCA takedown request, Suyu was removed from GitLab; the takedown notice cited violations of its anti-circumvention provisions, and warned that the platform's hosting of the code could constitute trafficking of an anti-circumvention device. After some hours, its leader decided to move to a self-hosted repository. In April 2024, chat platform Discord banned the accounts and servers of Suyu, another fork titled Sudachi, and their lead developers. Suyu has since switched to a self-hosted chat service. On 13 February 2025, Suyu announced ceasing of development.

A second Yuzu fork, called Torzu, has also appeared. It is notable for having its main git repository and development done in the Tor network. While takedown notices from Nintendo have taken down mirrors of the fork from GitHub and similar services, the Tor-based hidden services remain active.

On April 29, 2024, Nintendo of America filed a DMCA takedown notice to GitHub, resulting in the shutdown of 8,353 forks.

Following Suyu's cessation of development in February 2025, newer forks including Eden and Citron have emerged as the primary active continuations of the Yuzu codebase.

In February 2026, a DMCA takedown notice was issued to GitHub targeting a network of Switch emulators including the forks Eden and Citron.

== See also ==
- Nintendo Switch emulation
