= Installation 01 =

- Developer: Soon Studios
- Series: Halo (unofficial)
- Engine: Unity
- Platforms: Linux; macOS; Windows
- Genre: First-person shooter
- Mode: Multiplayer

Installation 01 is an upcoming fan-made first-person shooter video game based on the Halo series, developed by Soon Studios (previously known as The Installation 01 Team) for Microsoft Windows, macOS, and Linux operating systems in Unreal Engine 5.

== Development ==
The build of Installation 01 as demonstrated in the March 2017 multiplayer FAQ footage

Installation 01 is a fan-made, multiplayer-only project originally designed in Unity for Microsoft Windows, macOS, and Linux by Soon Studios. The intent is to replicate the multiplayer gameplay of Halo: Combat Evolved, Halo 2, Halo 3, Halo 4, and Halo 5 as a tribute to the series of games—with a specific target of Halo 3—and to do so without re-use of Microsoft assets. The game is named after the Halo ring created by the Forerunner race in the Halo universe.

The studio planned to support some features from later Halo games, but only in custom game modes. Game artist Seth H. described a tension in the art and game design of Installation 01 caused by the Halo series' individual game designs. They plan to provide map-making tools.

An extremely-early version of the game was displayed in August 2014. In November 2015, the game was displayed with functional multiplayer in "very small counts" of players; Kotaku noted that the game had not progressed far since August 2014. The team sought to have a playable version of the video game in Q4 2016. The studio was composed of over 30 people at this time.

A test for the multiplayer mode was scheduled for November 2016, with plans for a later single-player mode. At the time, the studio had made a number of familiar game elements, as well as both refreshed and remade versions of certain game maps. Animation polish and additional gameplay elements remained. Kotaku said the game was progressing well in March 2017. In May, a cinematic trailer was released, which featured character and weapons models based on Halo 3 designs. Animator Matthew Lake animated a trailer for both his final academic assignment and to generate excitement for the game. The game's release date was still unknown. In July 2023, the studio announced it would be switching the project to Unreal Engine 5. In November 2023, an early development post was made on Twitter, showcasing a playtest in Unreal Engine 5. Some art assets have been used in the new engine, but Soon Studios clarified that they're doing the programming from scratch.

There has not been a publicly available build throughout development, and there is no release date.

=== Legality ===
Soon Studios approached Microsoft around August 2016 regarding Microsoft's intellectual property, but did not receive a reply at the time. GameSpot also inquired, without receiving a response. In June 2017, Soon Studios announced their ongoing communication with 343 Industries and Microsoft. The studio has been transparent with 343 Industries regarding plans for the game. 343 Industries confirmed that the developers are "not under imminent legal threat". Installation 01's development is covered under Microsoft's Game Content Usage Rules, as long as the game remains non-commercial. He elaborates that they will never accept donations, or sell Installation 01 or Halo related merchandise as to keep a respectful distance between the studio and Microsoft's intellectual property. He also notes that these rules and assurances from Microsoft are specific to Installation 01 as a project, and do not apply elsewhere.
