= Mig Flash =

Nintendo Switch accessory

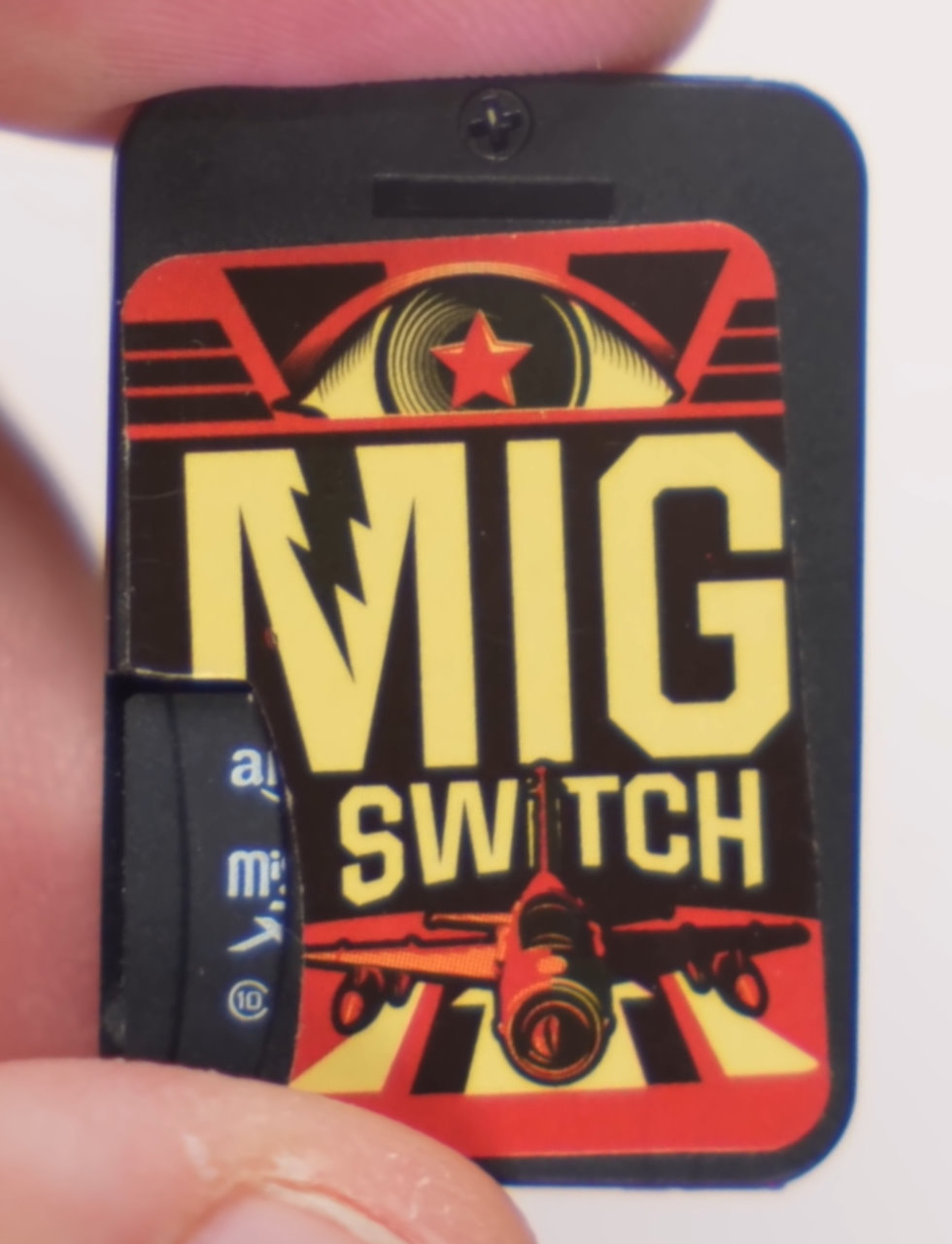
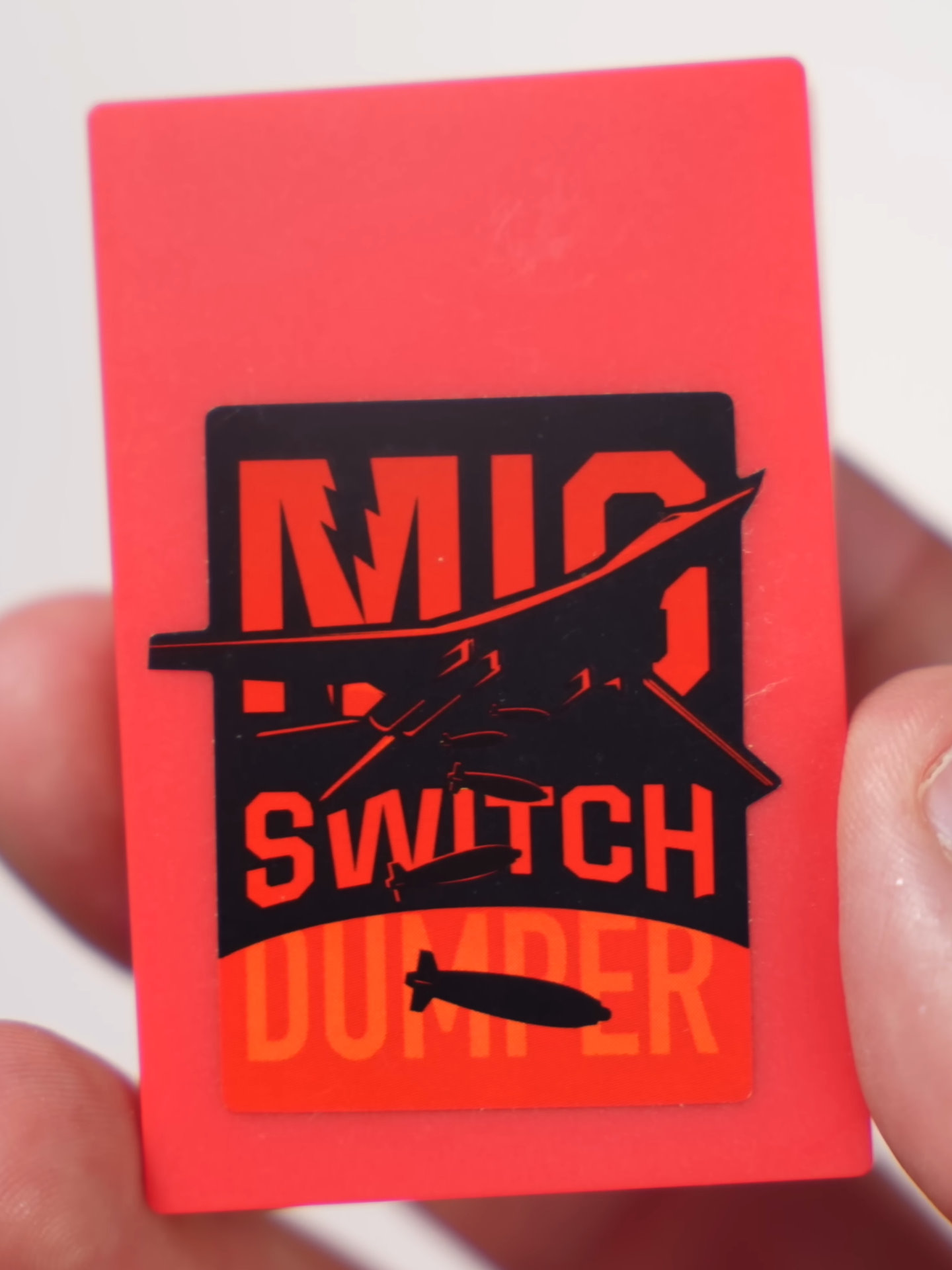
Mig Flash (left) and Mig Flash Dumper (right) under their former name Mig Switch

Mig Flash, (Note: Stylized as MIG Flash) formerly known as the Mig Switch, is a third-party accessory for Nintendo Switch and Nintendo Switch 2 consoles that allows users to play games from a MicroSD card that have been backed up from the console with the Mig Flash Dumper. Because there is no checking if the game has been obtained legitimately, Mig Flash allows the user to upload unlicensed ROM files to the console, enabling piracy and causing a series of litigations by Nintendo against individuals selling the device.

== Specifications ==
=== Mig Flash ===
Mig Flash is a flash cartridge shaped like a Nintendo Game Card. A MicroSD card containing ROM and certificate data of a game is inserted inside the flash card, with the card acting like an adapter. After inserting Mig Flash into the Switch's cartridge slot, the game appears on the console's main menu. Multiple games may be loaded on Mig Flash, though the system can only recognize one at a time, requiring the user to eject the Mig Flash or press the button on the top of the Mig Flash v2 for cycling between games.

=== Mig Flash Dumper ===
Mig Flash Dumper is a game backup device for Nintendo Switch cartridges. It uses an ESP32 chip to grab the game data, including ROM certificates.

== Compatibility ==
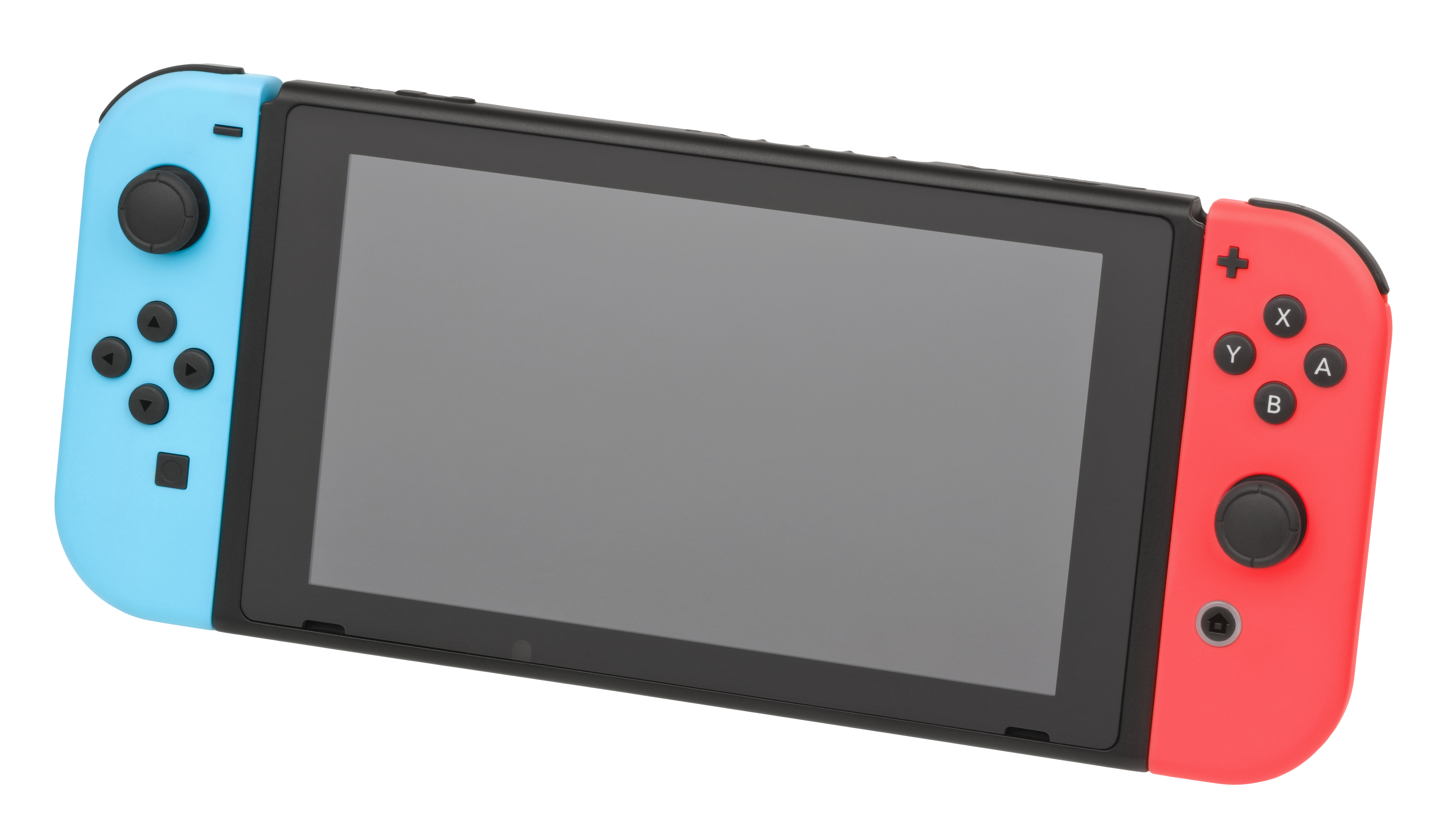
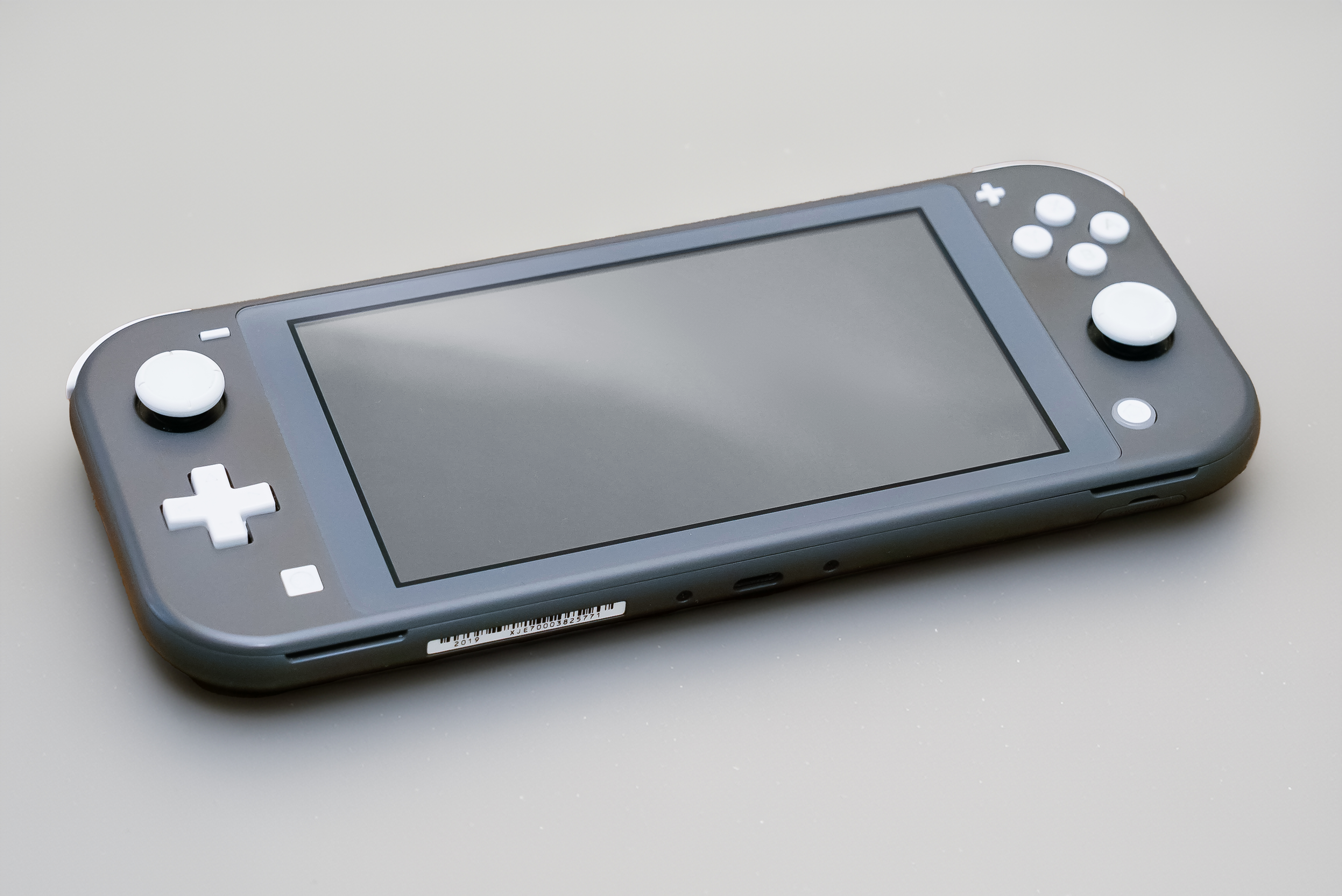
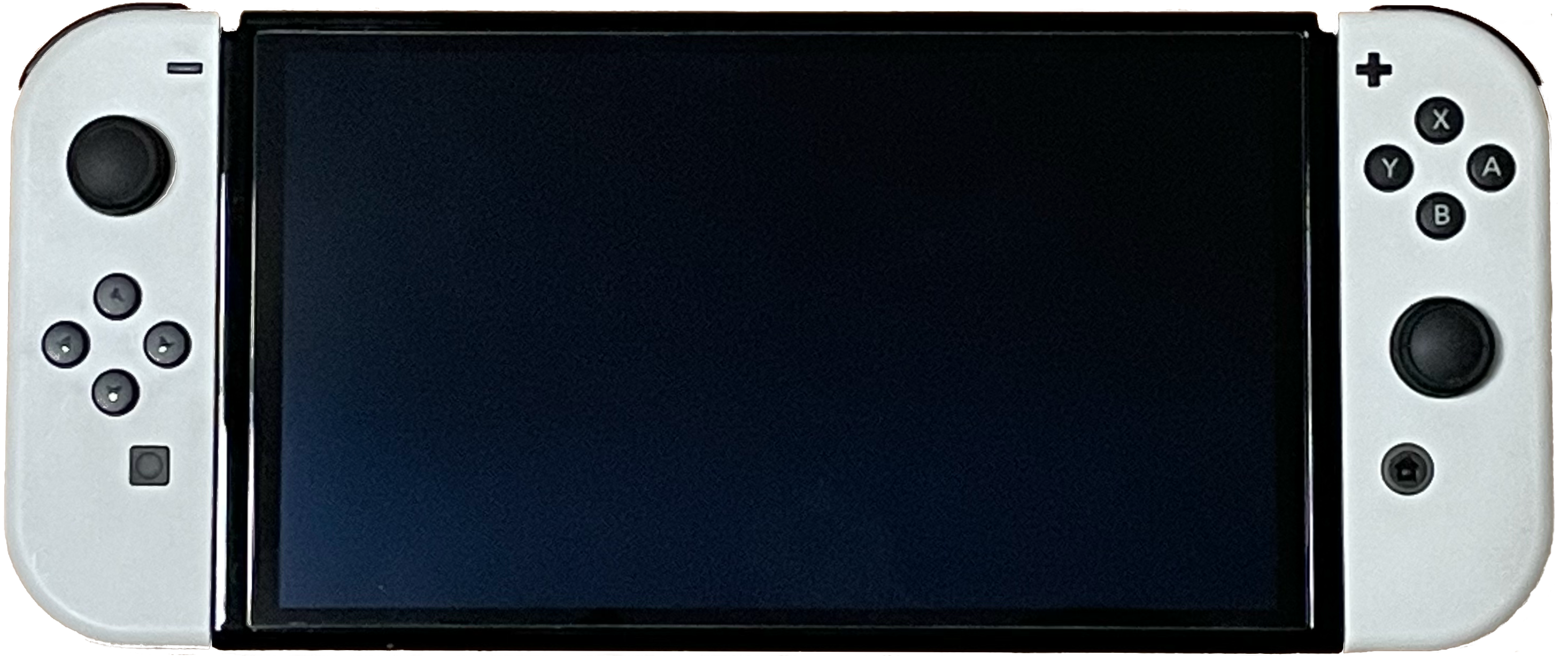
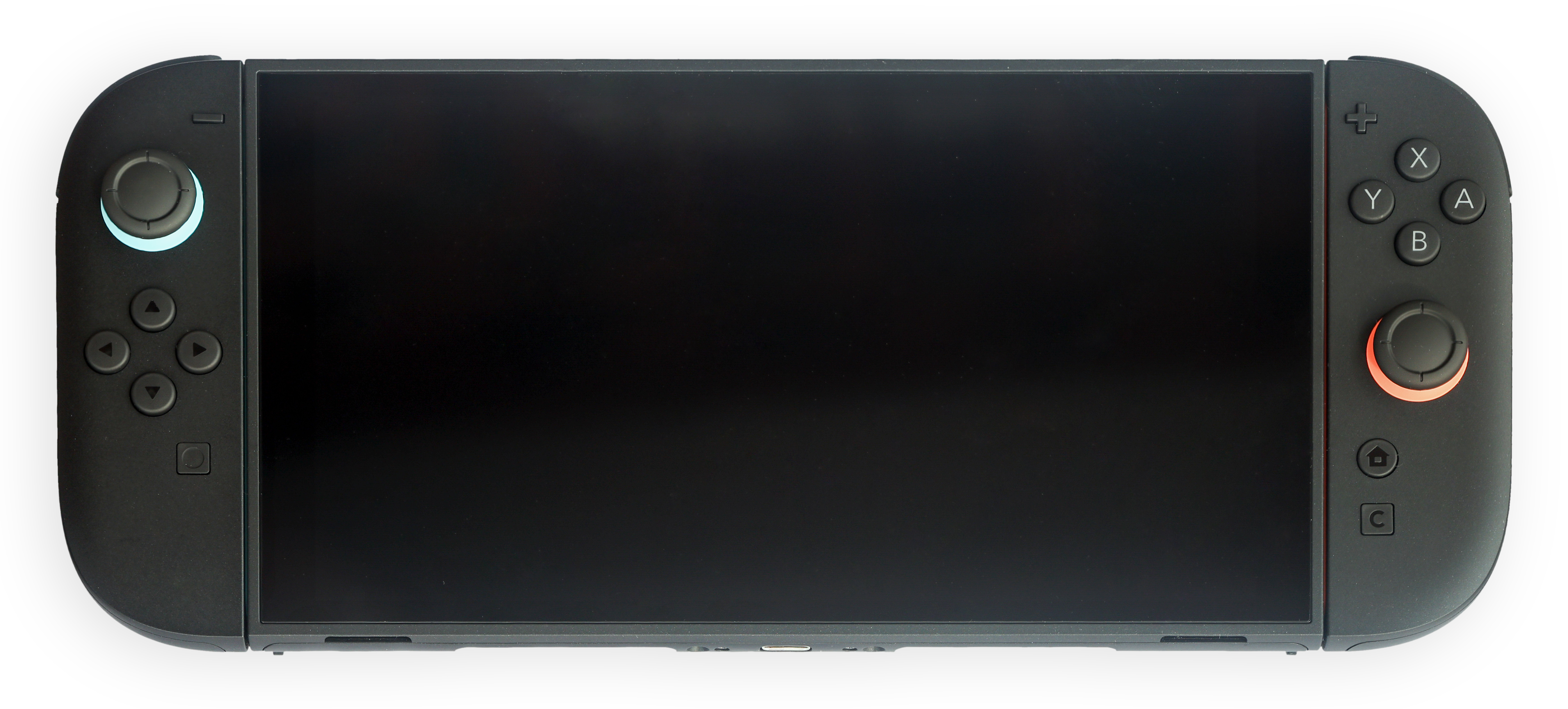
Various Nintendo Switch models (left-right: Switch, Switch Lite, Switch OLED) and Nintendo Switch 2 (bottom-right), all compatible with Mig Flash

Mig Flash was marketed to be compatible with all Nintendo Switch models without the need of modding the console or installing homebrew.

Because of additional security measures on Nintendo Switch 2, trying to use Mig Flash on the console was originally resulting in online services becoming unavailable for the said console regardless of whether the loaded games were pirated or not. Nintendo did not comment on the situation in that time, though Mig Flash's sideloading abilities are thought to be against Switch 2's terms of service. On June 15, 2025, Mig Flash received a firmware update, allowing it to be seemingly undetected by the Switch 2. According to the patch notes, the update makes Mig Flash "virtually undetectable" from a real cartridge. A bug bounty program was also initiated to fix more potential vulnerabilities, though the company still does not guarantee that users will not get banned.

== Litigation ==
On Nintendo's official website, Mig Flash is described as a "circumvention device" that is supposedly illegal to distribute. Various lawsuits have been enacted by Nintendo against individuals selling Mig Flash. In October 2024, Nintendo filed a complaint against Ryan Michael Daly, accusing him of selling "piracy-enabling devices" such as Mig Flash, as well as hacked consoles and mod chips that allegedly caused "significant and irreparable harm" to Nintendo. In September 2025, after unsuccessfully defending himself without a lawyer, Daly was ordered to pay Nintendo $2 million in damages while also getting a permanent injunction from continuing to operate his website as well as handling, selling or promoting modding devices and modded consoles.

In 2026, Mig Flash was included in the list of notorious markets compiled by the Office of the United States Trade Representative, a list of markets with alledged large-scale intellectual property infringement.

== See also ==
- Game Genie
- Homebrew (video games)
- Intellectual property protection by Nintendo
- Nintendo Switch emulation
- Ripping
