= Citra (emulator) =

Discontinued Nintendo 3DS emulator

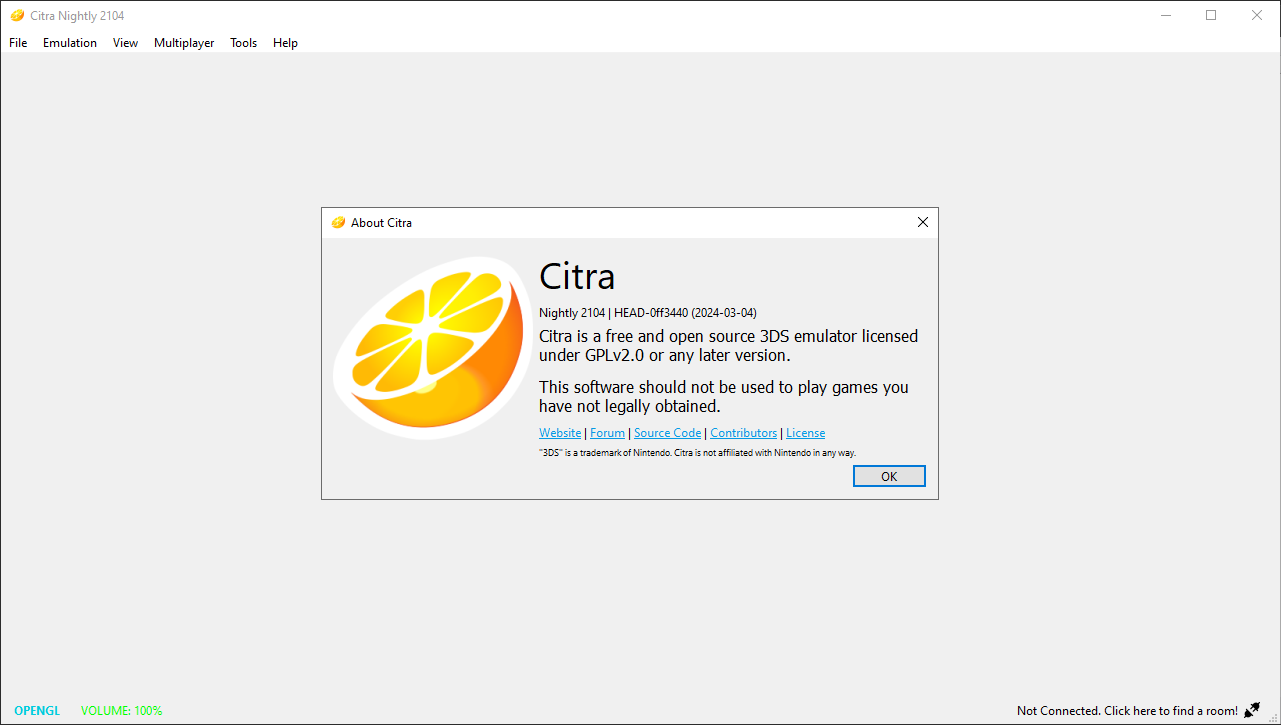
- Citra Nightly 2104 running on Windows
- Developer: Citra team
- Release: April 24, 2014; 12 years ago
- Final release: Nightly 2104 / 4 March 2024; 2 years ago
- Preview release: Canary 2798 / 4 March 2024; 2 years ago
- Written in: C++
- Operating system: Windows, macOS, Linux, Android
- Platform: x86-64; ARM64
- Available in: 22 languages
- Type: Video game console emulator
- License: GPL-2.0-or-later
- Website: https://citra-emu.org at the Wayback Machine (archived March 3, 2024)
- Repository: https://github.com/citra-emu/citra at the Wayback Machine (archived March 2, 2024)

Citra is a discontinued free and open-source game console emulator of the Nintendo 3DS, a handheld system, for Windows, macOS, Linux, and Android. Citra's name is derived from CTR, which is the model name of the original 3DS. Citra can run many homebrew games and commercial games.

Citra was first made available in 2014. The core team behind it went on to develop Nintendo Switch emulator Yuzu in 2018. Support for Citra by the Yuzu team was dropped on March 5, 2024, following a $2.4 million settlement reached with Nintendo of America.

== Development ==
Citra was initially created in April 2014. The first commercial Nintendo 3DS game to be run by Citra was The Legend of Zelda: Ocarina of Time 3D.

Citra has been able to emulate audio since May 21, 2016, and has had a JIT compiler since September 15, 2016. In November 2017, Citra announced networking support for the emulator. The networking support emulates the 3DS's local Wi-Fi, which originally made it possible to play over local networks. Additionally, Citra allows the networking to be compatible with other users anywhere. In April 2020, the Citra Team announced compatibility with New Nintendo 3DS games and support for save states, and in May 2020, they announced a version of Citra for Android. The console's Home Menu was bootable from March 2023. In September 2023, support for Vulkan was added as an experimental alternative to OpenGL.

== Shutdown ==
In March 2024, Nintendo and Yuzu developer Tropic Haze LLC., reached a settlement prompting Tropic Haze to shut down operations for Yuzu. Additionally, Tropic Haze agreed to surrender or cease working on any project that involved Nintendo's copyrighted properties, and as a result support for Citra was dropped by the developers.

== System requirements ==
Citra System Requirements
Requirement	Requirements	
Personal Computer
Operating system	Windows 10 (64-bit) or higher; macOS Big Sur or higher; Modern 64-bit desktop Linux	
CPU	x86-64 CPU	Single Core Performance > 1,800 on Passmark
Graphics hardware	OpenGL 4.3; Vulkan 1.1	
Android
Operating system	Android 8.0 (64-bit)	
CPU	AArch64	Snapdragon 835 or better
Graphics hardware	OpenGL ES 3.2; Vulkan 1.1	

== Successor ==
Azahar

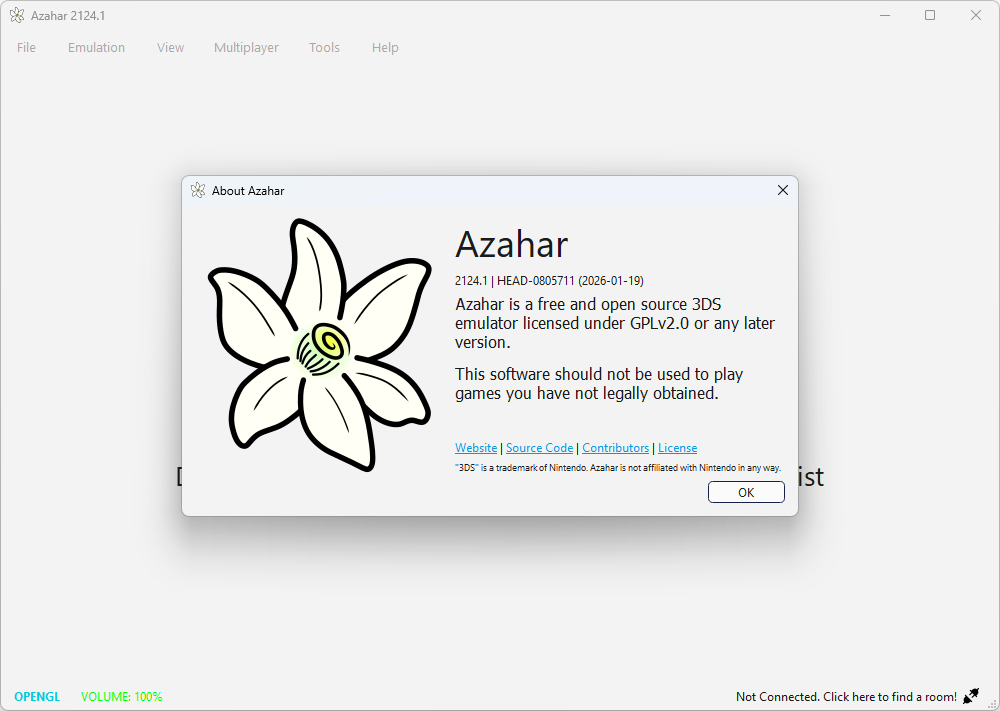
- Azahar Emulator about dialog
- Original author: Citra team
- Developer: Azahar Emulator team
- Release: 22 March 2025; 17 months ago
- Stable release: 2126.0 / 10 August 2026; 37 days ago
- Written in: C++
- Operating system: Windows, macOS, Linux, Android
- Platform: x86-64; ARM64
- Type: Video game console emulator
- License: GPL-2.0-or-later
- Website: azahar-emu.org
- Repository: github.com/azahar-emu/azahar

Azahar was created as a community-driven continuation of Nintendo 3DS emulation development following the discontinuation of the Citra emulator. The name Azahar is derived from the Spanish word for "orange blossom", continuing the citrus themed naming established by the previous emulator’s name and logo.

=== Development ===
In the months that followed Citra's shutdown, several independent forks of Citra emerged as members of the emulation community sought to continue Nintendo 3DS emulation development. In late 2024, two of them (Lime3DS and a fork maintained by a former Citra developer) announced the merge of their codebases and development efforts under a new project named Azahar. The first public releases of Azahar were made available in early 2025.

The emulator was released incorporating changes developed in its predecessor forks, including user interface and user experience improvements from Lime3DS, as well as additional functionality originating from the fork maintained by the former Citra developer, such as Artic Base, a homebrew tool designed to enable access to software libraries hosted on original Nintendo 3DS systems. The initial release also introduced additional changes, including the removal of support for encrypted ROM files. The development team stated that this decision was intended to reduce concerns related to the circumvention of technological protection measures, an issue raised during the legal proceedings involving Yuzu. The release also added support for re-downloading previously purchased software from the Nintendo 3DS digital storefront, the Nintendo eShop.

Development of Azahar continued during 2025 and early 2026, with the inclusion of compressed ROM support, dual screen capabilities on Android and other general improvements.

=== System requirements ===
Azahar System Requirements
Requirement	Requirements	
Personal Computer
Operating system	Windows 10 (64-bit) or higher; macOS Ventura or higher; Modern 64-bit desktop Linux	
CPU	x86-64 CPU with SSE4.2 support	Single-core performance > 1,800 on Passmark
Memory	2 GB	
Graphics hardware	OpenGL 4.3; Vulkan 1.1	
Android
Operating system	Android 10 (64-bit)	
CPU	AArch64	Snapdragon 835 or better
Memory	2 GB	
Graphics hardware	OpenGL ES 3.2; Vulkan 1.1	

=== Reception ===
Time Extension noted the emulator's ability to cache shaders on game load, resulting in higher performance and decreased frame rate stutters compared to other emulators. Android Authority called Azahar "the best way to play Nintendo 3DS games on Android". Retro Dodo called the emulator "one of the best on the market".
