= PC game =

Video game for a personal computer

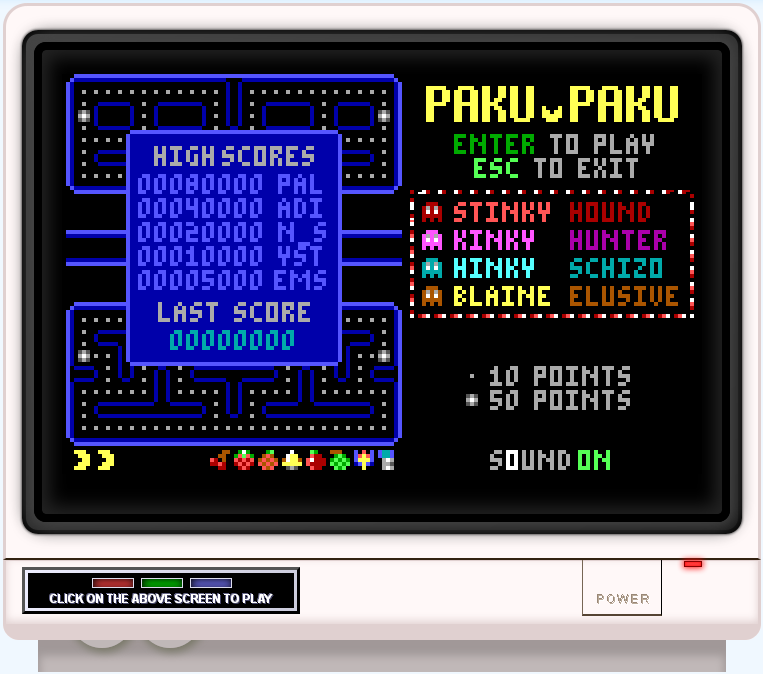
Paku Paku is a video game clone of Pac-Man.

A PC game, historically also known as a computer game, is a video game played on a personal computer (PC). The term PC game has been popularly used specifically to games on Windows software with Intel hardware known as Wintel, which has dominated the computer industry since the 1990s.

Mainframe and minicomputer games are a precursor to personal computer games. Home computer games became popular following the video game crash of 1983. In the 1990s, PC games lost mass market traction to console games on the fifth generation such as the Sega Saturn, Nintendo 64 and PlayStation. They are enjoying a resurgence in popularity since the mid-2000s through digital distribution on online service providers. Personal computers as well as general computer software are considered synonymous with IBM PC compatible systems; while mobile devices – smartphones and tablets, such as those running on Android or iOS platforms – are also PCs in the general sense as opposed to console or arcade machine. Historically, it also included games on systems from Apple Computer, Atari Corporation, Commodore International and others. Microsoft Windows utilizing Direct3D become the most popular operating system for PC games in the 2000s. Games utilizing 3D graphics generally require a form of graphics processing unit, and PC games have been a major influencing factor for the development and marketing of graphics cards. Emulators are able to play games developed for other platforms. The demoscene originated from computer game cracking.

The uncoordinated nature of the PC game market makes precisely assessing its size difficult. PC remains the most important gaming platform with 60% of developers being most interested in developing a game for the platform and 66% of developers currently developing a game for PC. In 2018, the global PC games market was valued at about $27.7 billion. According to research data provided by Statista in 2020 there were an estimated 1.75 billion PC gamers worldwide, up from 1.5 billion PC gaming users in the previous year. Newzoo reported that the PC gaming sector was the third-largest category across all platforms as of 2016, with the console sector second-largest, and mobile gaming sector biggest. 2.2 billion video gamers generate US$101.1 billion in revenue, excluding hardware costs. "Digital game revenues will account for $94.4 billion or 87% of the global gaming market. The APAC region was estimated to generate $46.6 billion in 2016, or 47% of total global video game revenues (note, not only "PC" games). China alone accounts for half of APAC's revenues (at $24.4 billion), cementing its place as the largest video game market in the world, ahead of the US's anticipated market size of $23.5 billion.

== History ==
=== Mainframes and minicomputers ===
Spacewar!, developed for the PDP-1 in 1961, is often credited as being the second ever computer game. The game consisted of two player-controlled spaceships maneuvering around a central star, each attempting to destroy the other.

Bertie the Brain was one of the first game playing machines developed. It was built in 1950 by Josef Kates. It measured more than four meters tall, and was displayed at the Canadian National Exhibition that year.

Although personal computers only became popular with the development of the microprocessor and microcomputer, computer gaming on mainframes and minicomputers had previously already existed. OXO, an adaptation of tic-tac-toe for the EDSAC, debuted in 1952. Another pioneer computer game was developed in 1961, when MIT students Martin Graetz and Alan Kotok, with MIT student Steve Russell, developed Spacewar! on a PDP-1 mainframe computer used for statistical calculations.

The first generation of computer games were often text-based adventures or interactive fiction, in which the player communicated with the computer by entering commands through a keyboard. An early text-adventure, Adventure, was developed for the PDP-11 minicomputer by Will Crowther in 1976, and expanded by Don Woods in 1977. By the 1980s, personal computers had become powerful enough to run games like Adventure, but by this time, graphics were beginning to become an important factor in games. Later games combined textual commands with basic graphics, as seen in the SSI Gold Box games such as Pool of Radiance, or The Bard's Tale, for example.

=== Early personal computer games ===
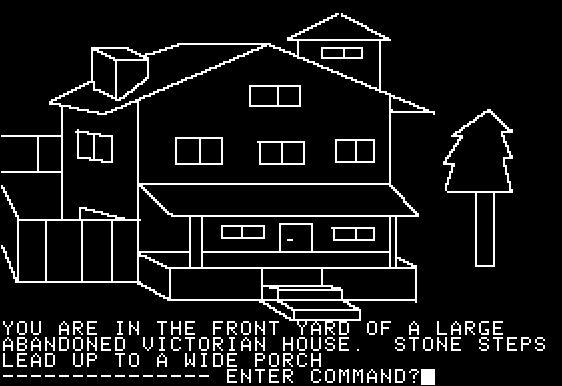
Mystery House (1980, Apple II), a text-based adventure game

By the late 1970s to early 1980s, games were developed and distributed through hobbyist groups and gaming magazines, such as Creative Computing and later Computer Gaming World. These publications provided game code that could be typed into a computer and played, encouraging readers to submit their own software to competitions. Players could modify the BASIC source code of even commercial games. Microchess was one of the first games for microcomputers which was sold to the public. First sold in 1977, Microchess eventually sold over 50,000 copies on cassette tape.

As with second-generation video game consoles at the time, early home computer game companies capitalized on successful arcade games at the time with ports or clones of popular arcade video games. By 1982, the top-selling games for the Atari 8-bit computers were ports of Frogger and Centipede, while the top-selling game for the TI-99/4A was the Space Invaders clone TI Invaders. That same year, Pac-Man was ported to the Atari 8-bit computers, while Donkey Kong was licensed for the Coleco Adam. In late 1981, Atari, Inc. attempted to take legal action against unauthorized Pac-Man clones, despite some of these predating Atari's exclusive rights to the home versions of Namco's game. Thousands of children attended the 1982 West Coast Computer Faire to see computer games there, despite organizers warning that the convention "is designed for mature individuals".

=== Industry crash and aftermath ===
As the American video game market became flooded with poor-quality cartridge games created by numerous companies attempting to enter the market, and overproduction of high-profile releases such as the Atari 2600 adaptations of Pac-Man and E.T. grossly underperformed, the popularity of personal computers for education rose dramatically. In 1983, American consumer interest in console video games dwindled to historical lows, as interest in games on personal computers rose. The effects of the crash were largely limited to the console market, as established companies such as Atari posted record losses over subsequent years. Conversely, the home computer market boomed, as sales of low-cost color computers such as the Commodore 64 rose to record highs and developers such as Electronic Arts benefited from increasing interest in the platform.

=== Growth of home computer games ===
The North American console market experienced a resurgence in the United States with the release of the Nintendo Entertainment System (NES). In Europe, computer gaming continued to boom for many years after. Computers such as the ZX Spectrum and BBC Micro were successful in the European market, where the NES was not as successful despite its monopoly in Japan and North America. The only 8-bit console to have any success in Europe would be the Master System. Meanwhile, in Japan, both consoles and computers became major industries, with the console market dominated by Nintendo and the computer market dominated by NEC's PC-88 (1981) and PC-98 (1982). A key difference between Western and Japanese computers at the time was the display resolution, with Japanese systems using a higher resolution of 640x400 to accommodate Japanese text, which in turn affected video game design and allowed more detailed graphics. Japanese computers were also using Yamaha's FM synth sound boards from the early 1980s.

To enhance the immersive experience with their unrealistic graphics and electronic sound, early PC games included extras such as the peril-sensitive sunglasses that shipped with The Hitchhiker's Guide to the Galaxy or the science fiction novella included with Elite. These extras gradually became less common, but many games were still sold in the traditional oversized boxes that used to hold the extra "feelies". Today, such extras are usually found only in Special Edition versions of games, such as Battle chests from Blizzard.

During the 16-bit era, the Amiga and Atari ST became popular in Europe, the Macintosh and IBM PC compatibles became popular in North America, while the PC-98, X68000, and FM Towns became popular in Japan. The Amiga, X68000 and FM Towns were capable of producing near arcade-quality hardware sprite graphics and sound quality when they first released in the mid-to-late 1980s.

=== Growth of IBM PC compatible games ===
Among launch titles for the IBM Personal Computer (PC) in 1981 was Microsoft Adventure, which IBM described as bringing "players into a fantasy world of caves and treasures". BYTE that year stated that the computer's speed and sophistication made it "an excellent gaming device", and IBM and others sold games like Microsoft Flight Simulator. The PC's CGA graphics and speaker sound were poor, however, and most customers bought the powerful but expensive computer for business. One ComputerLand owner estimated in 1983 that a quarter of corporate executives with computers "have a game hidden somewhere in their drawers", and InfoWorld in 1984 reported that "in offices all over America (more than anyone realizes) executives and managers are playing games on their computers", but software companies found selling games for the PC difficult; an observer said that year that Flight Simulator had sold hundreds of thousands of copies because customers with corporate PCs could claim that it was a "simulation".

From mid-1985, however, what Compute! described as a "wave" of inexpensive IBM PC clones from American and Asian companies, such as the Tandy 1000 and the Leading Edge Model D, caused prices to decline; by the end of 1986, the equivalent to a $1600 real IBM PC with 256K RAM and two disk drives cost as little as $600, lower than the price of the Apple IIc. Consumers began purchasing DOS computers for the home in large numbers. While often purchased to do work on evenings and weekends, clones' popularity caused consumer-software companies to increase the number of IBM-compatible products, including those developed specifically for the PC as opposed to porting from other computers. Bing Gordon of Electronic Arts reported that customers used computers for games more than one fifth of the time whether purchased for work or a hobby, with many who purchased computers for other reasons finding PC games "a pretty satisfying experience".

PC game sales rose by 198% year over year in the first half of 1987, compared to 57% for the market overall. The formerly business-only computer had become the largest and fastest-growing, and most important platform for computer game companies. More than a third of games sold in North America were for the PC, twice as many as those for the Apple II and even outselling those for the Commodore 64. By 1988 Computer Gaming World agreed with Joel Billings of Strategic Simulations that an inexpensive clone with EGA graphics was superior for games. The Tandy 1000's enhanced graphics, sound, and built-in joystick ports made it the best platform for IBM PC-compatible games before the VGA era.

By 1988, the enormous popularity of the Nintendo Entertainment System had greatly affected the computer-game industry. A Koei executive claimed that "Nintendo's success has destroyed the [computer] software entertainment market". A Mindscape executive agreed, saying that "Unfortunately, its effect has been extremely negative. Without question, Nintendo's success has eroded software sales. There's been a much greater falling off of disk sales than anyone anticipated." A third attributed the end of growth in sales of the Commodore 64 to the console, and Trip Hawkins called Nintendo "the last hurrah of the 8-bit world". Experts were unsure whether it affected 16-bit computer games, but games lost shelf space at computer software stores, and many of the hundreds of computer-game companies went out of business. Hawkins said that while foreign videogame competition increased, "there's an increase in product supply without an increase in demand". He in 1990 had to deny rumors that Electronic Arts would withdraw from computers and only produce console games. By 1993, ASCII Entertainment reported at a Software Publishers Association conference that the market for console games ($5.9 billion in revenue) was 12 times that of the computer-game market ($430 million).

However, computer games did not disappear. The industry hoped that the CD-ROM and other optical storage technology would increase computers' user friendliness and allow for more sophisticated games. By 1989, Computer Gaming World reported that "the industry is moving toward heavy use of VGA graphics". While some games were advertised with VGA support at the start of the year, they usually supported EGA graphics through VGA cards. By the end of 1989, however, most publishers moved to supporting at least 320x200 MCGA, a subset of VGA. VGA gave the PC graphics that outmatched the Amiga. Increasing adoption of the computer mouse, driven partially by the success of adventure games such as the highly successful King's Quest series, and high resolution bitmap displays allowed the industry to include increasingly high-quality graphical interfaces in new releases.

Further improvements to game artwork and audio were made possible with the introduction of FM synthesis sound. Yamaha began manufacturing FM synth boards for computers in the early-mid-1980s, and by 1985, the NEC and FM-7 computers had built-in FM sound. The first PC sound cards, such as AdLib's Music Synthesizer Card, soon appeared in 1987. These cards allowed IBM PC compatible computers to produce complex sounds using FM synthesis, where they had previously been limited to simple tones and beeps. However, the rise of the Creative Labs Sound Blaster card, released in 1989, which featured much higher sound quality due to the inclusion of a PCM channel and digital signal processor, led AdLib to file for bankruptcy by 1992. Also in 1989, the FM Towns computer included built-in PCM sound, in addition to a CD-ROM drive and 24-bit color graphics.

In the late 80s and throughout the entire 1990s decade, DOS was one of the most popular gaming platforms in regions where it was officially sold.

By 1990, DOS was 65% of the computer-game market, with the Amiga at 10%; all other computers, including the Apple Macintosh, were below 10% and declining. Although both Apple and IBM tried to avoid customers associating their products with "game machines", the latter acknowledged that VGA, audio, and joystick options for its PS/1 computer were popular. In 1991, id Software produced an early first-person shooter, Hovertank 3D, which was the company's first in their line of highly influential games in the genre. There were also several other companies that produced early first-person shooters, such as Arsys Software's Star Cruiser, which featured fully 3D polygonal graphics in 1988, and Accolade's Day of the Viper in 1989. Id Software went on to develop Wolfenstein 3D in 1992, which helped to popularize the genre, kick-starting a genre that would become one of the highest-selling in modern times. The game was originally distributed through the shareware distribution model, allowing players to try a limited part of the game for free but requiring payment to play the rest, and represented one of the first uses of texture mapping graphics in a popular game, along with Ultima Underworld.

In December 1992, Computer Gaming World reported that DOS accounted for 82% of computer-game sales in 1991, compared to Macintosh's 8% and Amiga's 5%. In response to a reader's challenge to find a DOS game that played better than the Amiga version the magazine cited Wing Commander and Civilization, and added that "The heavy MS-DOS emphasis in CGW merely reflects the realities of the market". A self-reported Computer Gaming World survey in April 1993 similarly found that 91% of readers primarily used IBM PCs and compatibles for gaming, compared to 6% for Amiga, 3% for Macintosh, and 1% for Atari ST, while a Software Publishers Association study found that 74% of personal computers were IBMs or compatible, 10% Macintosh, 7% Apple II, and 8% other. 51% of IBM or compatible had 386 or faster CPUs.

By 1992, DOS games such as Links 386 Pro supported Super VGA graphics. While leading Sega and Nintendo console systems kept their CPU speed at 3–7 MHz, the 486 PC processor ran much faster, allowing it to perform many more calculations per second. The 1993 release of Doom on the PC was a breakthrough in 3D graphics, and was soon ported to various game consoles in a general shift toward greater realism. Computer Gaming World reiterated in 1994, "we have to advise readers who want a machine that will play most of the games to purchase high-end MS-DOS machines".

By 1993, PC floppy disk games had a sales volume equivalent to about one-quarter that of console game ROM cartridge sales. A hit PC game typically sold about 250,000 disks at the time, while a hit console game typically sold about 1 million cartridges.

By spring 1994, an estimated 24 million US homes (27% of households) had a personal computer. 48% played games on their computer; 40% had the 486 CPU or higher; 35% had CD-ROM drives; and 20% had a sound card. Another survey found that an estimated 2.46 million multimedia computers had internal CD-ROM drives by the end of 1993, an increase of almost 2,000%. Computer Gaming World reported in April 1994 that some software publishers planned to only distribute on CD as of 1995. CD-ROM had much larger storage capacity than floppies, helped reduce software piracy, and was less expensive to produce. Chris Crawford warned that it was "a data-intensive technology, not a process-intensive one", tempting developers to emphasize the quantity of digital assets like art and music over the quality of gameplay; Computer Gaming World wrote in 1993 that "publishers may be losing their focus". While many companies used the additional storage to release poor-quality shovelware collections of older software, or "enhanced" versions of existing ones—often with what the magazine mocked as "amateur acting" in the added audio and video—new games such as Myst included many more assets for a richer game experience.

Many companies sold "multimedia upgrade kits" that bundled CD drives, sound cards, and software during the mid-1990s, but device drivers for the new peripherals further depleted scarce RAM. By 1993, PC games required much more memory than other software, often consuming all of conventional memory, while device drivers could go into upper memory with DOS memory managers. Players found modifying CONFIG.SYS and AUTOEXEC.BAT files for memory management cumbersome and confusing, and each game needed a different configuration. (The game Les Manley in: Lost in L.A. satirizes this by depicting two beautiful women exhaust the hero in bed, by requesting that he again explain the difference between extended and expanded memory.) Computer Gaming World provided technical assistance to its writers to help install games for review, and published sample configuration files. The magazine advised non-technical gamers to purchase commercial memory managers like QEMM and 386MAX and criticized nonstandard software like Origin Systems's "infamous late and unlamented Voodoo Memory Manager", which used unreal mode.

=== Contemporary PC gaming ===
Logo used by majority of PC games sold in a CD format

Logo used by majority of PC games sold in a DVD format

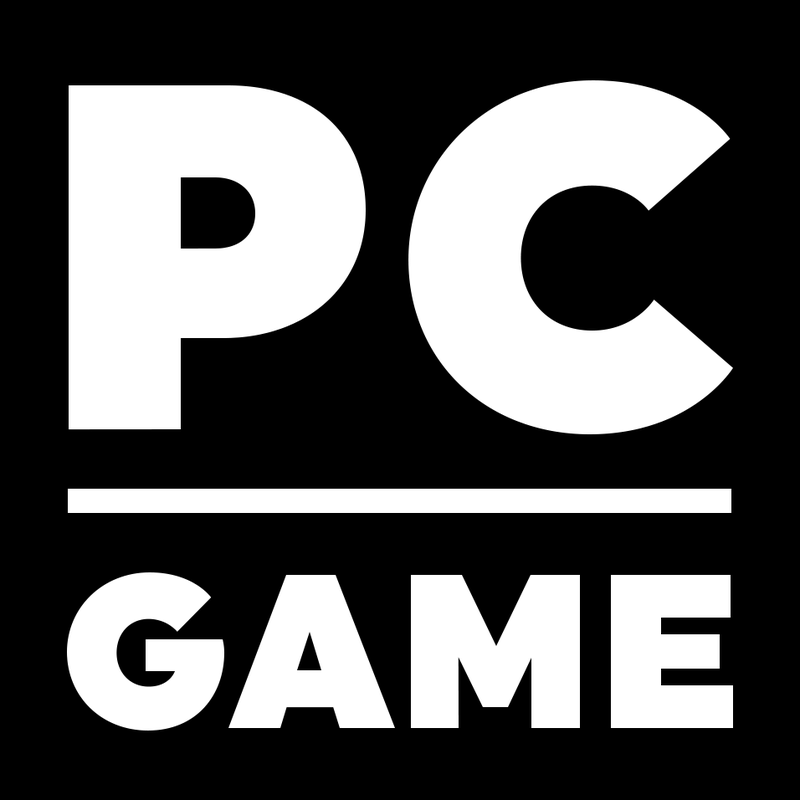
PC Game logo found on most contemporary box arts and trailers

By 1996, the growing popularity of Microsoft Windows simplified device driver and memory management. The success of 3D console titles such as Super Mario 64 and Tomb Raider increased interest in hardware accelerated 3D graphics on PCs, and soon resulted in attempts to produce affordable products with the ATI Rage, Matrox Mystique, S3 ViRGE, and Rendition Vérité. As 3D graphics libraries such as DirectX and OpenGL matured and knocked proprietary interfaces out of the market, these platforms gained greater acceptance in the market, particularly with their demonstrated benefits in games such as Unreal. However, major changes to the Microsoft Windows operating system, by then the market leader, made many older DOS-based games unplayable on Windows NT, and later, Windows XP (without using an emulator, such as DOSBox).

The faster graphics accelerators and improving CPU technology resulted in increasing levels of realism in computer games. During this time, the improvements introduced with products such as ATI's Radeon R300 and NVidia's GeForce 6 series have allowed developers to increase the complexity of modern game engines. PC gaming currently tends strongly toward improvements in 3D graphics.

Unlike the generally accepted push for improved graphical performance, the use of physics engines in computer games has become a matter of debate since announcement and 2005 release of the nVidia PhysX PPU, ostensibly competing with middleware such as the Havok physics engine. Issues such as difficulty in ensuring consistent experiences for all players, and the uncertain benefit of first generation PhysX cards in games such as Tom Clancy's Ghost Recon Advanced Warfighter and City of Villains, prompted arguments over the value of such technology.

Similarly, many game publishers began to experiment with new forms of marketing. Chief among these alternative strategies is episodic gaming, an adaptation of the older concept of expansion packs, in which game content is provided in smaller quantities but for a proportionally lower price. Titles such as Half-Life 2: Episode One and Episode Two took advantage of the idea, with mixed results rising from concerns for the amount of content provided for the price.

== Platform characteristics ==
The defining characteristic of the PC platform is the absence of centralized control, an open platform; all other gaming platforms (except Android devices, to an extent) are owned and administered by a single group.

PCs may possess varying processing resources of video gaming systems. Game developers may integrate options to adjust screen resolution, framerate, and anti-aliasing. Increased draw distance and NPCs amount is also possible in open world games. The most common forms of input are the mouse/keyboard combination and gamepads, though touchscreens and motion controllers are also available. The mouse in particular lends players of first-person shooter and real-time strategy games on PC great speed and accuracy. Users may use third-party peripherals.

The advantages of openness include:

- Reduced software cost
Prices are kept down by competition and the absence of platform-holder fees. Games and services are cheaper at every level, and many are free.
- Increased flexibility
PC games decades old can be played on modern systems, through emulation software if need be. Conversely, newer games can often be run on older systems by reducing the games' fidelity, scale or both.
- Increased innovation
One does not need to ask for permission to release or update a PC game or to modify an existing one, and the platform's hardware and software are constantly evolving. These factors make PC the centre of both hardware and software innovation. By comparison, closed platforms tend to remain much the same throughout their lifespan.

There are also disadvantages, including:

- Increased complexity
A PC is a general-purpose tool. Its inner workings are exposed to the owner, and misconfiguration can create enormous problems. Hardware compatibility issues are also possible. Game development is complicated by the wide variety of hardware configurations; developers may be forced to limit their design to run with sub-optimum PC hardware in order to reach a larger PC market, or add a range graphical and other settings to adjust for playability on individual machines, requiring increased development, test, and customer support resources.
- Increased hardware cost
PC components are generally sold individually for profit (even if one buys a pre-built machine), whereas the hardware of closed platforms is mass-produced as a single unit and often sold at a smaller profit, or even a loss (with the intention of making profit instead in online service fees and developer kit profits).
- Reduced security
It is difficult, and in most situations ultimately impossible, to control the way in which PC hardware and software is used. This leads to far more software piracy and cheating than closed platforms suffer from.

=== Modifications ===
The openness of the PC platform allows players to edit or modify their games and distribute the results over the Internet as "mods". A healthy mod community greatly increases a game's longevity and the most popular mods have driven purchases of their parent game to record heights. It is common for professional developers to release the tools they use to create their games (and sometimes even source code) in order to encourage modding, but if a game is popular enough mods generally arise even without official support.

Mods can compete with official downloadable content however, or even outright redistribute it, and their ability to extend the lifespan of a game can work against its developers' plans for regular sequels. As game technology has become more complex, it has also become harder to distribute development tools to the public.

Modding has a different connotation on consoles which are typically restricted much more heavily. As publicly released development tools are rare, console mods usually refer to hardware alterations designed to remove restrictions.

=== Digital distribution services ===
PC games are sold predominantly through the Internet, with buyers downloading their new purchase directly to their computer. This approach allows smaller independent developers to compete with large publisher-backed games and avoids the speed and capacity limits of the optical discs which most other gaming platforms rely on.

Valve released the Steam platform for Windows computers in 2003 as a means to distribute Valve-developed video games such as Half-Life 2. It would later see release on the Mac OS X operating system in 2010 and was released on Linux in 2012. By 2011, it controlled 70% of the market for downloadable PC games, with a userbase of about 40 million accounts. Origin, a new version of the Electronic Arts online store, was released in 2011 in order to compete with Steam and other digital distribution platforms on the PC. The period between 2004 and now saw the rise of many digital distribution services on PC, such as Amazon Digital Services, GameStop, GFWL, EA Store, Direct2Drive, GOG.com, and GamersGate.

Digital distribution also slashes the cost of circulation, eliminates stock shortages, allows games to be released worldwide at no additional cost, and allows niche audiences to be reached with ease. However, most digital distribution systems create ownership and customer rights issues by storing access rights on distributor-owned computers. Games confer with these computers over the Internet before launching. This raises the prospect of purchases being lost if the distributor goes out of business or chooses to lock the buyer's account, and prevents resale (the ethics of which are a matter of debate).

Valve does not release any sales figures on its Steam service, instead it only provides the data to companies with games on Steam, which they cannot release without permission due to signing a non-disclosure agreement with Valve. However, Stardock, the previous owner of competing platform Impulse, estimated that, as of 2009, Steam had a 70% share of the digital distribution market for video games. In early 2011, Forbes reported that Steam sales constituted 50–70% of the $4 billion market for downloaded PC games and that Steam offered game producers gross margins of 70% of purchase price, compared with 30% at retail.

== PC gaming technology ==
An exploded view of a modern personal computer: 1. Display; 2. Motherboard; 3. CPU (Microprocessor); 4. Primary storage (RAM); 5. Expansion cards (graphics cards, etc.); 6. Power supply; 7. Optical disc drive; 8. Secondary storage (Hard disk); 9. Keyboard; 10. Mouse

=== Hardware ===
Modern computer games place great demand on the computer's hardware, often requiring a fast central processing unit (CPU) to function properly. CPU manufacturers historically relied mainly on increasing clock rates to improve the performance of their processors, but had begun to move steadily towards multi-core CPUs by 2005. These processors allow the computer to simultaneously process multiple tasks, called threads, allowing the use of more complex graphics, artificial intelligence and in-game physics.

Similarly, 3D games often rely on a powerful graphics processing unit (GPU), which accelerates the process of drawing complex scenes in realtime. GPUs may be an integrated part of the computer's motherboard, the most common solution in laptops, or come packaged with a discrete graphics card with a supply of dedicated Video RAM, connected to the motherboard through either an AGP or PCI Express port. It is also possible to use multiple GPUs in a single computer, using technologies such as NVidia's Scalable Link Interface and ATI's CrossFire.

Sound cards are also available to provide improved audio in computer games. These cards provide improved 3D audio and provide audio enhancement that is generally not available with integrated alternatives, at the cost of marginally lower overall performance. The Creative Labs Sound Blaster line was for many years the de facto standard for sound cards, although its popularity dwindled as PC audio became a commodity on modern motherboards.

Physics processing units (PPUs), such as the Nvidia PhysX (formerly AGEIA PhysX) card, are also available to accelerate physics simulations in modern computer games. PPUs allow the computer to process more complex interactions among objects than is achievable using only the CPU, potentially allowing players a much greater degree of control over the world in games designed to use the card.

Virtually all personal computers use a keyboard and mouse for user input, but there are exceptions. During the 1990s, before the keyboard and mouse combination had become the method of choice for PC gaming input peripherals, there were other types of peripherals such as the Mad Catz Panther XL, the First-Person Gaming Assassin 3D, and the Mad Catz Panther, which combined a trackball for looking / aiming, and a joystick for movement. Other common gaming peripherals are a headset for faster communication in online games, joysticks for flight simulators, steering wheels for driving games and gamepads for console-style games.

=== Software ===
Computer games also rely on third-party software such as an operating system (OS), device drivers, libraries and more to run. Today, the vast majority of computer games are designed to run on the Microsoft Windows family of operating systems. Whereas earlier games written for DOS would include code to communicate directly with hardware, today application programming interfaces (APIs) provide an interface between the game and the OS, simplifying game design. Microsoft's DirectX is an API that is widely used by today's computer games to communicate with sound and graphics hardware. OpenGL is a cross-platform API for graphics rendering that is also used. The version of the graphics card's driver installed can often affect game performance and gameplay. In late 2013, AMD announced Mantle, a low-level API for certain models of AMD graphics cards, allowing for greater performance compared to software-level APIs such as DirectX, as well as simplifying porting to and from the PlayStation 4 and Xbox One consoles, which are both built upon AMD hardware. It is not unusual for a game company to use a third-party game engine, or third-party libraries for a game's AI or physics.

=== Types of gaming ===
==== Local area network gaming ====
Multiplayer gaming was largely limited to local area networks (LANs) before cost-effective broadband Internet access became available, due to their typically higher bandwidth and lower latency than the dial-up services of the time. These advantages allowed more players to join any given computer game, but have persisted today because of the higher latency of most Internet connections and the costs associated with broadband Internet.

LAN gaming typically requires two or more personal computers, a router and sufficient networking cables to connect every computer on the network. Additionally, each computer must have its own copy (or spawn copy) of the game in order to play. Optionally, any LAN may include an external connection to the Internet.

==== Online games ====
Online multiplayer games have achieved popularity largely as a result of increasing broadband adoption among consumers. Affordable high-bandwidth Internet connections allow large numbers of players to play together, and thus have found particular use in massively multiplayer online role-playing games, Tanarus and persistent online games such as World War II Online.

Although it is possible to participate in online computer games using dial-up modems, broadband Internet connections are generally considered necessary in order to reduce the latency or "lag" between players. Such connections require a broadband-compatible modem connected to the personal computer through a network interface card (generally integrated onto the computer's motherboard), optionally separated by a router. Online games require a virtual environment, generally called a "game server". These virtual servers inter-connect gamers, allowing real time, and often fast-paced action. To meet this subsequent need, Game Server Providers (GSP) have become increasingly more popular over the last half decade. While not required for all gamers, these servers provide a unique "home", fully customizable, such as additional modifications, settings, etc., giving the end gamers the experience they desire. Today there are over 510,000 game servers hosted in North America alone.

==== Emulation ====
Emulation software, used to run software without the original hardware, are popular for their ability to play legacy video games without the platform for which they were designed. The operating system emulators include DOSBox, a DOS emulator which allows playing games developed originally for this operating system and thus not compatible with a modern-day OS. Console emulators such as Nestopia and MAME are relatively commonplace, although the complexity of modern consoles such as the Xbox or PlayStation makes them far more difficult to emulate, even for the original manufacturers. The most technically advanced consoles that can currently be successfully emulated for commercial games on PC are the PlayStation 2 using PCSX2, and the Nintendo Wii U using the Cemu emulator. A PlayStation 3 emulator named RPCS3 is in development. Most emulation software mimics a particular hardware architecture, often to an extremely high degree of accuracy. This is particularly the case with classic home computers such as the Commodore 64, whose software often depends on highly sophisticated low-level programming tricks invented by game programmers and the demoscene.

Other projects aim to bring compatibility of older games and its features back to modern platforms such as WineVDM (for running 16-bit games on 64-bit Windows), nGlide (for enabling the Glide API to other video cards), IPXWrapper (for enabling IPX/SPX based LAN play).

== Controversy ==
PC games have long been a source of controversy, largely due to the depictions of violence that has become commonly associated with video games in general, with much of the criticism stemming from the fact that the PC gaming industry is not as regulated as on other platforms. The debate surrounds the influence of objectionable content on the social development of minors, with organizations such as the American Psychological Association concluding that video game violence increases children's aggression, a concern that prompted a further investigation by the Centers for Disease Control in September 2006. Industry groups have responded by noting the responsibility of parents in governing their children's activities, while attempts in the United States to control the sale of objectionable games have generally been found unconstitutional.

Video game addiction is another cultural aspect of gaming to draw criticism as it can have a negative influence on health and on social relations. The problem of addiction and its health risks seems to have grown with the rise of massively multiplayer online role playing games (MMORPGs). Alongside the social and health problems associated with computer game addiction have grown similar worries about the effect of computer games on education.

== See also ==
- Multimedia PC
- Game studies
- Gaming computer
- PC Master Race
- List of PC games
  - List of best-selling PC games
