= ShadPS4 =

Emulator for PlayStation 4 software

shadPS4
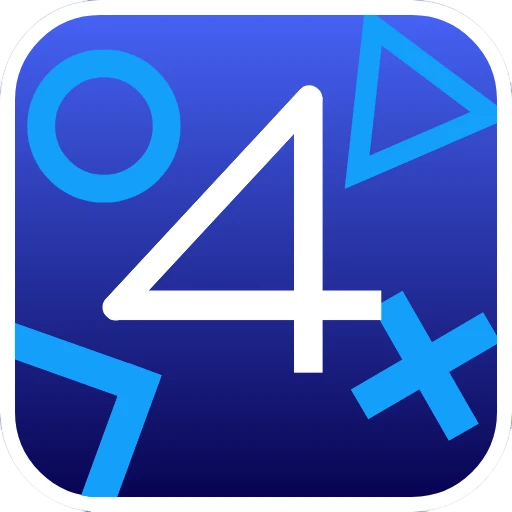

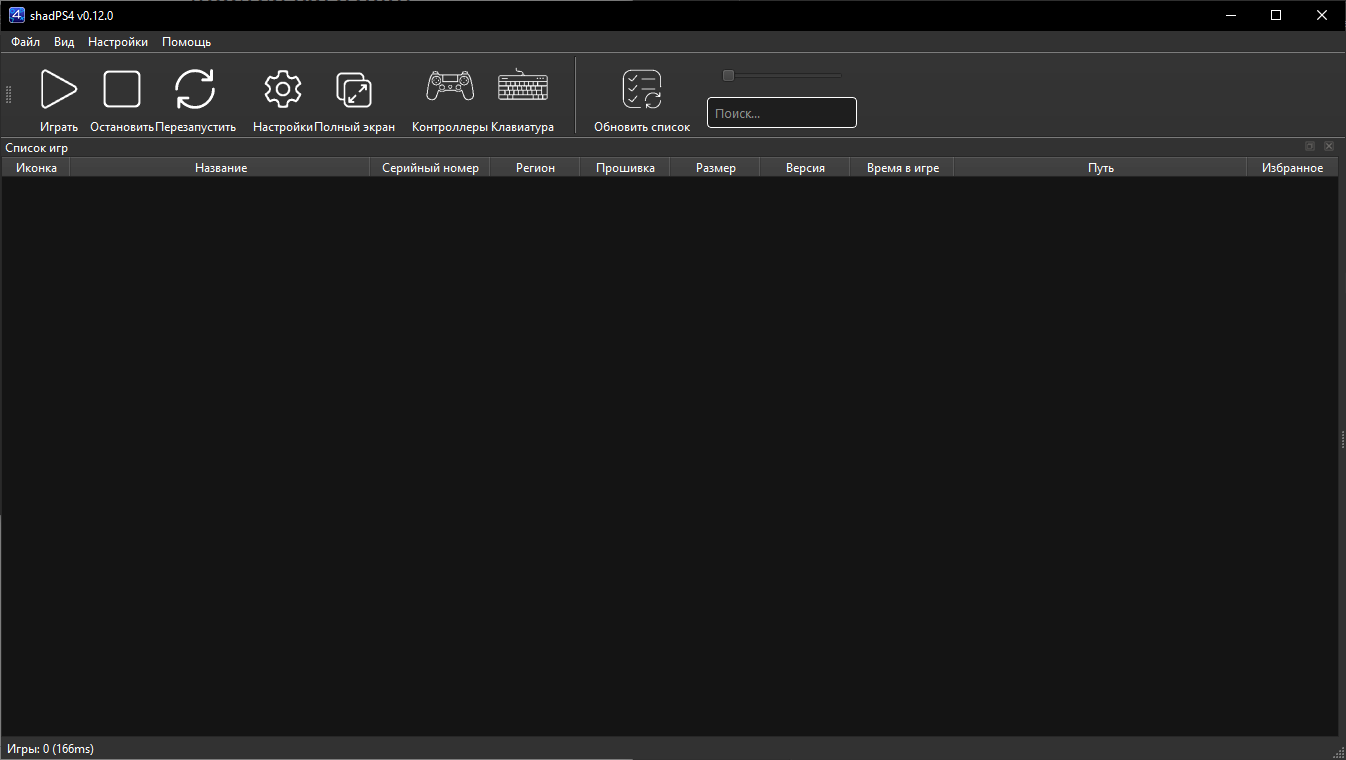
- Original author: George Moralis
- Release: September 29, 2023; 3 years ago
- Stable release: v0.21.0 (October 30, 2026; 4 days ago)
- Written in: C++
- Operating system: Windows; Linux; macOS
- Type: Video game console emulator
- License: GPLv2
- Website: shadps4.net
- Repository: github.com/shadps4-emu/shadPS4

shadPS4 is a free and open-source emulator for the PlayStation 4. It supports Windows, Linux and MacOS. As of November 2025, shadPS4 can emulate only certain games to varying degrees of support.

== Development ==
Development of shadPS4 was started by George Moralis in October 2022. Moralis previously worked on the PS1 emulator PCSX and founded the PS2 emulator PCSX2, going by the user name "shadow". At the time, PS4 emulation had not advanced very far, with most existing emulators being only able to run 2D games reliably. On July 2, 2024, shadPS4 version 0.1.0 was released, being able to launch Sonic Mania, One Piece: Unlimited World Red and some other 3D games such as Resident Evil: Origins Collection and Persona 5. A major factor contributing to its support for more 3D games was the addition of a shader recompiler to its architecture. By July 31, it could run Red Dead Redemption at 25 frames per second, and it was able to launch Dark Souls. By December 7, 2024, version 0.4.1 was in development and allowed games based on Unity to run on Windows, which meant many new games were now supported. On December 25, the major version 0.5.0 was released including further improvements. On July 6, 2025, version 0.10.0 was released with major improvements in games such as The Last Guardian and Driveclub. Version 0.10.0 also included a new feature called readbacks, which emulates the PlayStation 4's shared memory functionality. The feature is experimental and disabled by default as it causes performance and accuracy issues, but it improves vertex explosions in Bloodborne and allows updated versions of Driveclub to play races with minor issues such as missing motion blur. In September 2025, support for Unreal Engine games was added, and made a big milestone by being able to successfully enter gameplay in the 2016 Ratchet & Clank, with only one patch needed to bypass a hang. Version 0.13.0 added shader caching, further improving performance.

=== Bloodborne ===
The ability to emulate Bloodborne has been of long-standing interest to fans due to the lack of a PC port or remaster. By July 2024, Bloodborne could run and access the character creation menu, but had a major graphical bug causing a red filter to be applied to the screen. By August 19, version 0.2.1 was in development and was able to run both the alpha and retail version of Bloodborne without crashing, with some users able to run the game at a frame rate of more than 60 FPS. However, not all textures could be properly loaded, and several game specific hacks were used in order to run it. In early September rendering was greatly improved, with support being added for screen light occlusion, depth of field, dynamic lighting, and shadows. By January 2025, gaming outlets reported that Bloodborne was "very playable" as long as certain mods were installed to fix graphical bugs such as vertex explosions. In July 2025 version 0.10.0 added an experimental feature called readbacks that solved the vertex explosions. In January 2026, Digital Foundry reported frame rates up to 60 FPS at a 4K resolution using an Nvidia Geforce RTX 4080, though noted that frame rates above 60 FPS may lead to glitches.

== Compatibility ==
As of November 2025, 317 titles are listed by shadPS4 as being "in game", while 179 titles are listed as being "playable".

== See also ==
- PlayStation 4 system software § System for a description of the PS4 system's graphics APIs.
- Category:PlayStation 4-only games for a list of notable PS4 exclusive games.
- RPCS3, a PlayStation 3 emulator.
