= Ambra Personal Computers =

Trading name of ICPI Ltd, a defunct subsidiary of IBM (1992-1994)

AMBRA Personal Computers
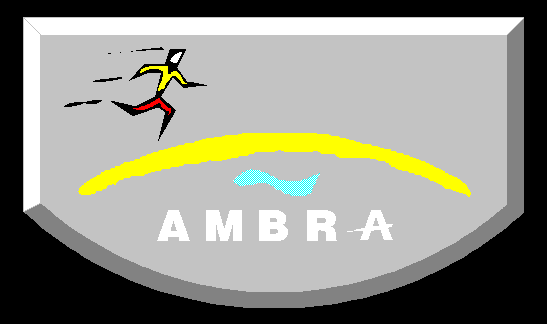
- AMBRA Personal Computers logo
- Company type: Subsidiary
- Industry: Information Technology
- Founded: June 4, 1992 (as Individual Computer Products International Limited)
- Founder: Alan Willsher
- Defunct: March 31, 1994 (UK & Europe)
- Fate: Defunct, Brand discontinued.
- Successor: IBM PS/2, IBM V/P, IBM Aptiva and Lenovo line of PCs
- Headquarters: Portsmouth, United Kingdom
- Area served: United Kingdom, Europe, Canada (United States through licensing to Ambra Computer Corporation)
- Key people: William E. McCracken, Alan J. Willsher, Giuseppe Giovanni
- Products: Slimline, Desktop, Mini-Tower and Notebook PCs
- Brands: AMBRA Sprinta, AMBRA Hurdla, AMBRA Treka, AMBRA Sprinta II, AMBRA Hurdla MT, AMBRA notebook Mk II, Maverick
- Number of employees: <50
- Parent: International Business Machines Corporation

AMBRA Personal Computers was the trading name of Individual Computer Products International (ICPI) Limited - a wholly owned UK subsidiary of IBM between 1992 and 1994, operating in the United Kingdom, Europe and Canada.

The AMBRA name was later licensed in 1993 by ICPI to the Ambra Computer Corporation in the United States, itself a subsidiary of IBM. This is noted in the small-print of US adverts such as PC World magazine between 1993 and 1994. The two organisations (Ambra Personal Computers & The Ambra Computer Corporation) operated independently of each other although clearly shared some hardware casing profiles (albeit named differently - for example in the AMBRA Hurdla in the UK and Europe shared the case of the D466DXA in the United States), and AMBRA specific software packages pre-loaded on the PCs consisting of an AMBRA branded tutorial and menu system designed to load from DOS on initial startup and was specific to the model of machine running on. They also used separately trademarked logos, Ambra Personal Computers using a colourful caricature of and athlete running over a hill.

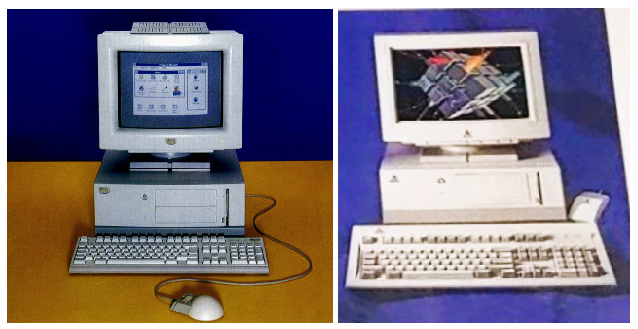
Advertising photographs from 1993/1994 of the AMBRA Hurdla (UK, left) and the AMBRA D466DXA (US, right).

== Foundation ==
The AMBRA name and ICPI Ltd. were established by Alan J Willsher within IBM UK, following a discussion with Bill McCracken, the general manager of personal systems in IBM Europe. McCracken was keen to start a set of low-cost, IBM-funded machines, due to the increasing number of "IBM Clones" appearing on the market during the early 1990s.

The registered company number was 1197742. The registered address was The Quay, 30 Channel Way, Ocean Village, Southampton, SO14 3QG, though advertising frequently quoted IBM's UK head office: PO Box 41, North Harbour, Portsmouth, Hampshire PO6 3AU.

The venture kicked off in November 1991, when Willsher's hand-picked team of nine IBM staff were challenged to launch the Ambra line of PCs by Christmas 1992. Using the resources and support of IBM, they achieved this six months ahead of schedule, with the launch taking place in June 1992. The branding and advertisements used an athletic theme designed to cater for the low-end business, budget and home user segments of the market. The launch portfolio consisted of three initial Intel 80386 models: a slimline desktop, a large desktop, and a notebook, known as the Ambra Sprinta, Ambra Hurdla, and Ambra Treka, respectively.

Other than the allocated budget, ICPI was given complete operational independence from IBM, with the only requirement to be successful. McCracken granted Willsher and his team full autonomy, with IBM not even to be mentioned in the marketing. From the outset concerns were raised both internally and in the media in that Ambra's product line would be a competitor to IBM's own-branded Personal Systems brand (PS/1 and PS/2) and ValuePoint machines.

== Initial launch ==
ICPI and Ambra were officially launched in June 1992, starting with the UK on 4 June, followed by France and ten other European countries.

Whilst launching, ICPI was already planning the launch of the 486 range - the same casing but with upgraded processors and specifications which would be released by December 1992. These cases were cosmetically identical, other than the number 486 being printed in the lower left corner to differentiate it from its predecessor.

The 486 range was announced on 14 September 1992, at which point Willsher was promoted by IBM to establish their consulting arm, and replaced by Giuseppe Giovanni, who was already working at ICPI. McCracken was promoted to President of Personal Systems of IBM Europe.

== Closure ==
On 16 February 1994, it was announced that Ambra Personal Computers and ICPI would cease operations from 31 March 1994. The Ambra Computer Corporation continued operation in the United States, but the UK and Europe operations under ICPI were wound up. By this point, the European operation employed 64 people, only four of them full-time IBM employees. Although no official reason was given, IBM said that they would be cutting the prices of their ValuePoint, PS/1 and ThinkPad machines, which would render Ambra uncompetitive.

Following the end of the AMBRA brand, IBM continued to manufacture their own PCs until 2005, when their personal computer business was sold to Chinese firm Lenovo.
