= Ambra Computer Corporation =

Subsidiary of IBM

- Logo used from 1992 to 1994
- Industry: Personal computers
- Founded: 1992
- Defunct: 1994 (worldwide); 1996 (Canada)
- Parent: IBM

Ambra Computer Corporation was a subsidiary of IBM in the United States. The name "Ambra" was licensed by Individual Computer Products International (ICPI) - a UK-based IBM subsidiary which owned Ambra Personal Computers in the UK - to the Ambra Computer Corporation. It introduced a line of personal computers targeted at the home user, sold mainly through mail-order, first in Europe (1992), then in the USA (1993). Ambra had a volume production run of just a year or so; the line was discontinued in 1994 in favor of the IBM Aptiva (except for Canada, where it was not discontinued until 1996).

== Models ==
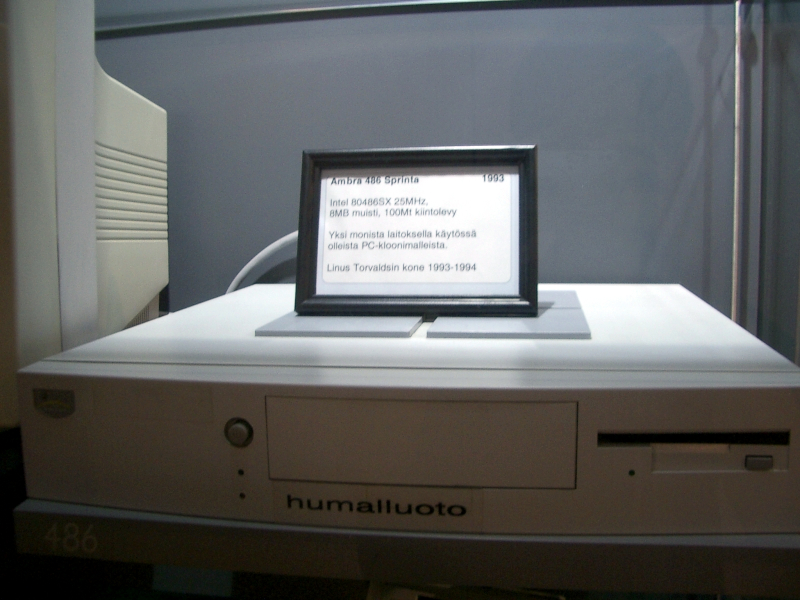
Ambra 486 Sprinta used by Linus Torvalds from 1993-1994.

- 386
- 486
- Achiever 2000
- Achiever 3000
- Achiever 4000
- Achiever 5000
- Achiever 7000
- Achiever 9000
- Achiever D
- Achiever DP
- Achiever S
- Achiever T
- Achiever Anthem
- Achiever Hurdla/Sprinta
- Notebook
- Ispirati (Canada)

== Positioning ==
Ambra PCs were generally positioned at the low-end of the market, and made use of their ties with IBM in marketing materials in order to make the machines appear better quality than the host of clones, since 'real' IBM PCs were known to be expensive. In reality the machines were fairly low specification, having shadow-mask screens, minimal onboard peripherals, and using low-end processors with the minimum memory and hard disk size at each price.

Television advertising for the brand in the UK used the slogan: "Take your mind for a run."

== Aesthetics ==
The machines were coloured off-white, which was unusual at the time, since most machines were beige. Generally the cases were compact and offered little room for expansion.

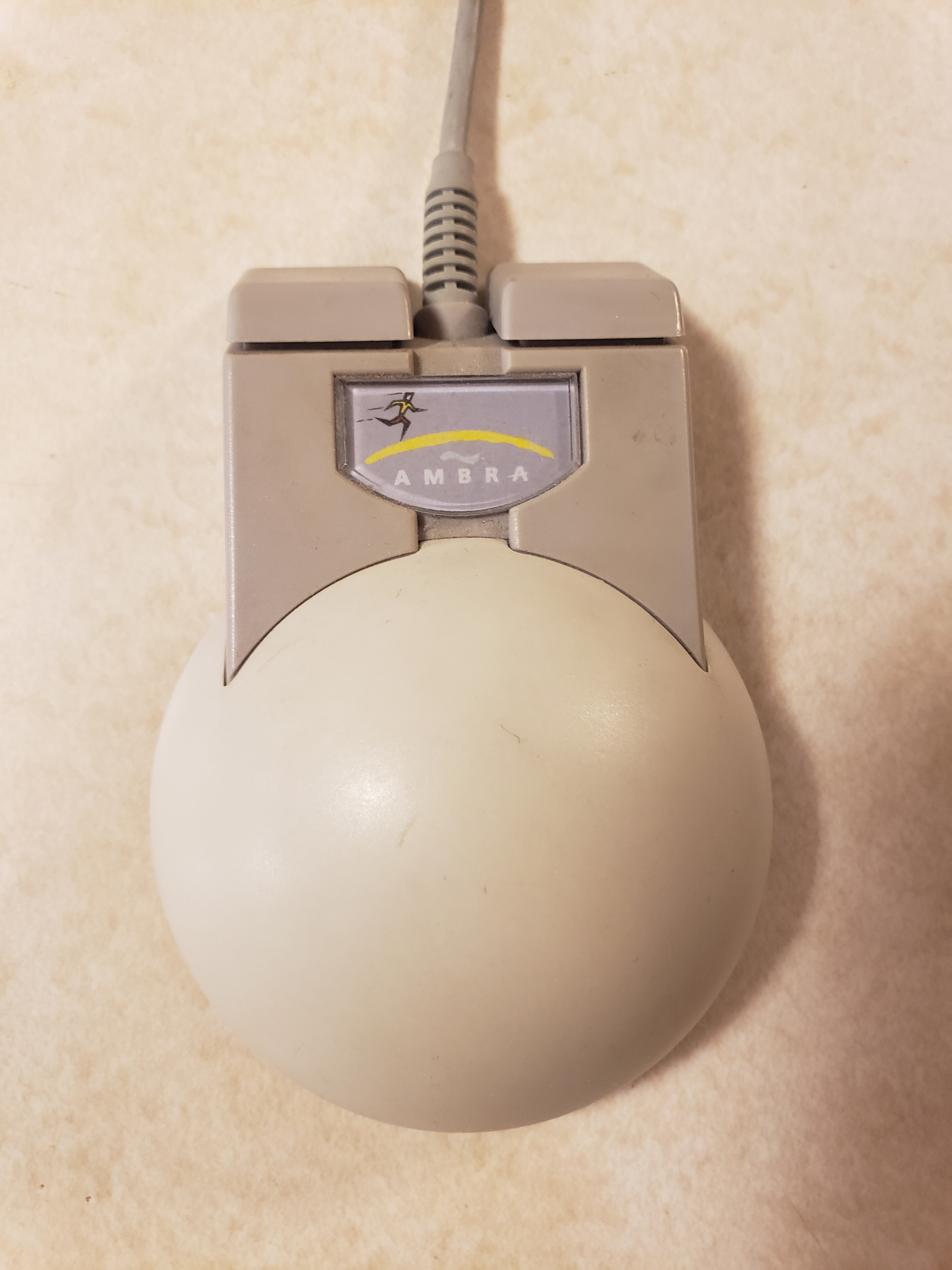
An Ambra mouse, showing its unusual front-button placement

One notable aspect was the original Ambra mouse, which differed from almost all other designs in the position of its buttons. Conventional mice have the buttons on top: the user clicks by pressing down. The Ambra mouse had the buttons on the front, either side of the cable: the user clicked by pulling their finger backward, in a manner similar to squeezing a trigger. Criticisms led to Ambra changing to a more conventional design: one UK magazine review described the mouse as "looking like a torture device."

== Timeline ==
Timeline of the IBM Personal Computer

Asterisk (*) denotes a model released in Japan only

== See also ==
- Acquisition of the IBM PC business by Lenovo
