= IBM Aptiva =

Line of personal computers developed and commercialized by IBM

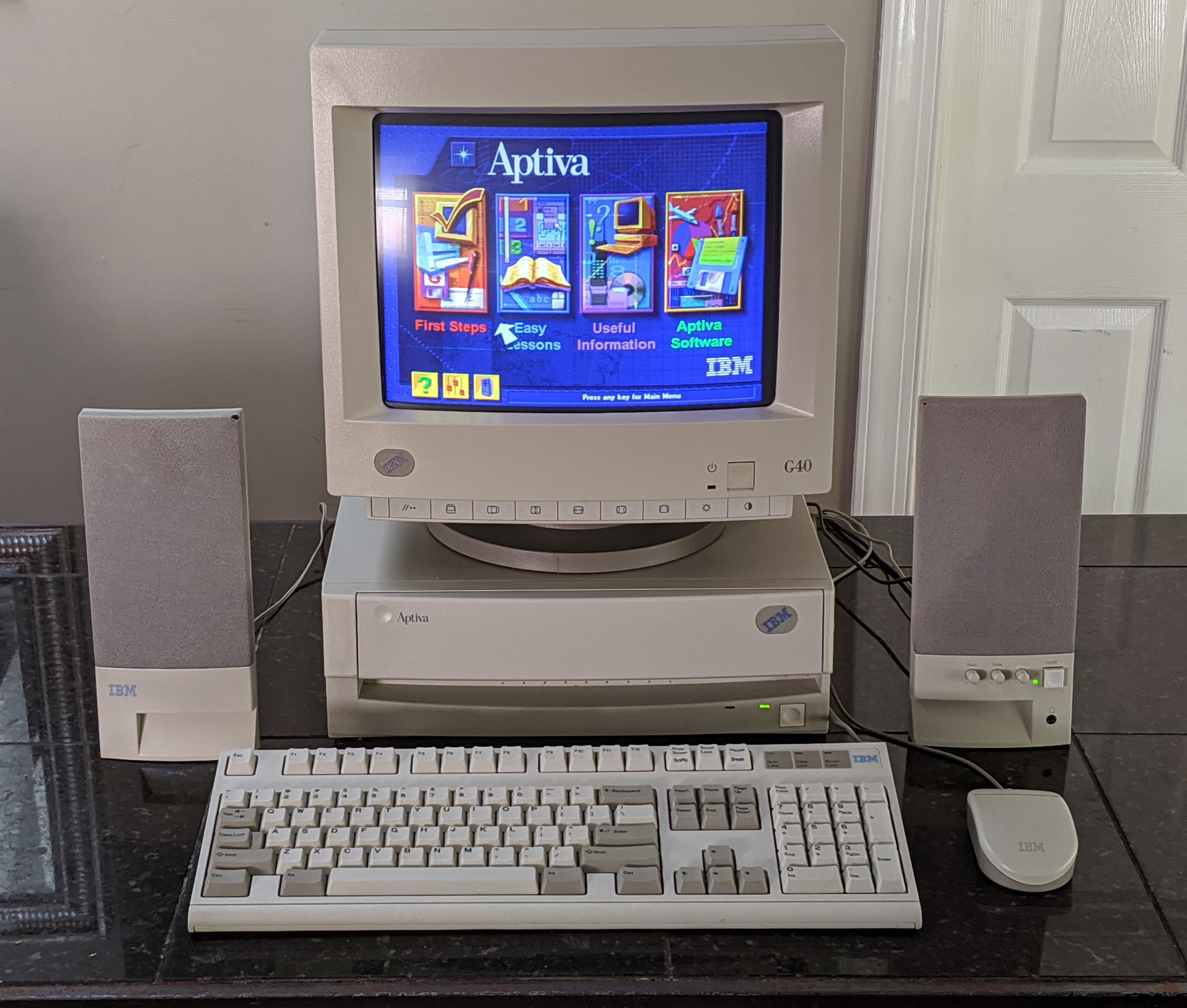
- An IBM Aptiva desktop unit from 1995. Pressing the top left corner of the front panel will open it to reveal the removable disk drives.
- Type: Personal computer
- Released: September 1994; 32 years ago
- Discontinued: May 2001
- CPU: Intel 80486
- Predecessor: IBM PS/1; IBM Ambra
- Successor: none
- Related: IBM PC Series
- Website: pc.ibm.com at the Wayback Machine (archived 1996-11-13)

IBM Aptiva is a line of personal computers that was produced by IBM. It was designed primarily for home use and offered a range of models with varying specifications and features. It was introduced in September 1994 as the replacement for the IBM PS/1.

The first Aptiva models were based on the Intel 80486 CPU. Later models used the Pentium and AMD CPUs. All systems were developed in-house except for the later E series which was developed by Acer.

Aptiva computers were typically sold as a bundle which included monitor, speakers, keyboard and mouse. First-generation models came with IBM PC DOS 6.3 and Windows 3.1. Pentium-generation Aptivas came with Windows 95 and OS/2 'select-a-system' (PC DOS 7/Windows 3.1 and OS/2 Warp) on selected models. Most Aptiva models included a modem and a standby/hibernation feature called "Rapid Resume".

Sound and modem functionality was provided on M, A, C and S models by an IBM Mwave adapter. The Mwave adaptor had multiple compatibility and performance issues and was eventually replaced by standard modems and sound cards. IBM settled a lawsuit for Mwave owners by refunding Aptiva Mwave owners a small monetary fee so that those owners could purchase industry standard devices.

The last Aptiva system was withdrawn from sale in May 2001 without a direct replacement when IBM decided to exit the home market. Customers were directed to the IBM NetVista, which was more targeted to business desktops.

== Market history ==
Among other things, IBM's development and marketing of Lotus SmartSuite and OS/2 placed it in direct competition with Microsoft Office and Microsoft Windows, respectively. As a result, Microsoft "punished the IBM PC Company with higher prices, a late license for Windows 95, and the withholding of technical and marketing support."

IBM was not granted OEM rights for Windows 95 until 15 minutes prior to the release of Windows 95, on August 24, 1995. Because of this uncertainty, IBM machines were sold without Windows 95, while Compaq, HP, and other companies sold machines with Windows 95 from day one.

The Aptiva never managed to recapture IBM's early 1980s PC dominance from Compaq, Dell, or HP. IBM's PC Group had higher costs than its competitors which made it impossible to match them on prices. Throughout the 1990s, IBM lost the most market share in PCs during that decade compared to its rivals, and only the ThinkPad laptop remained a stronghold. Most desktop and laptop sales were with longstanding corporate customers that already used IBM mainframe computers. Despite IBM's continued decline in hardware, that was more than offset by the company shifting focus to the more lucrative e-business (integrated e-commerce and Internet technology solutions).

== Models ==
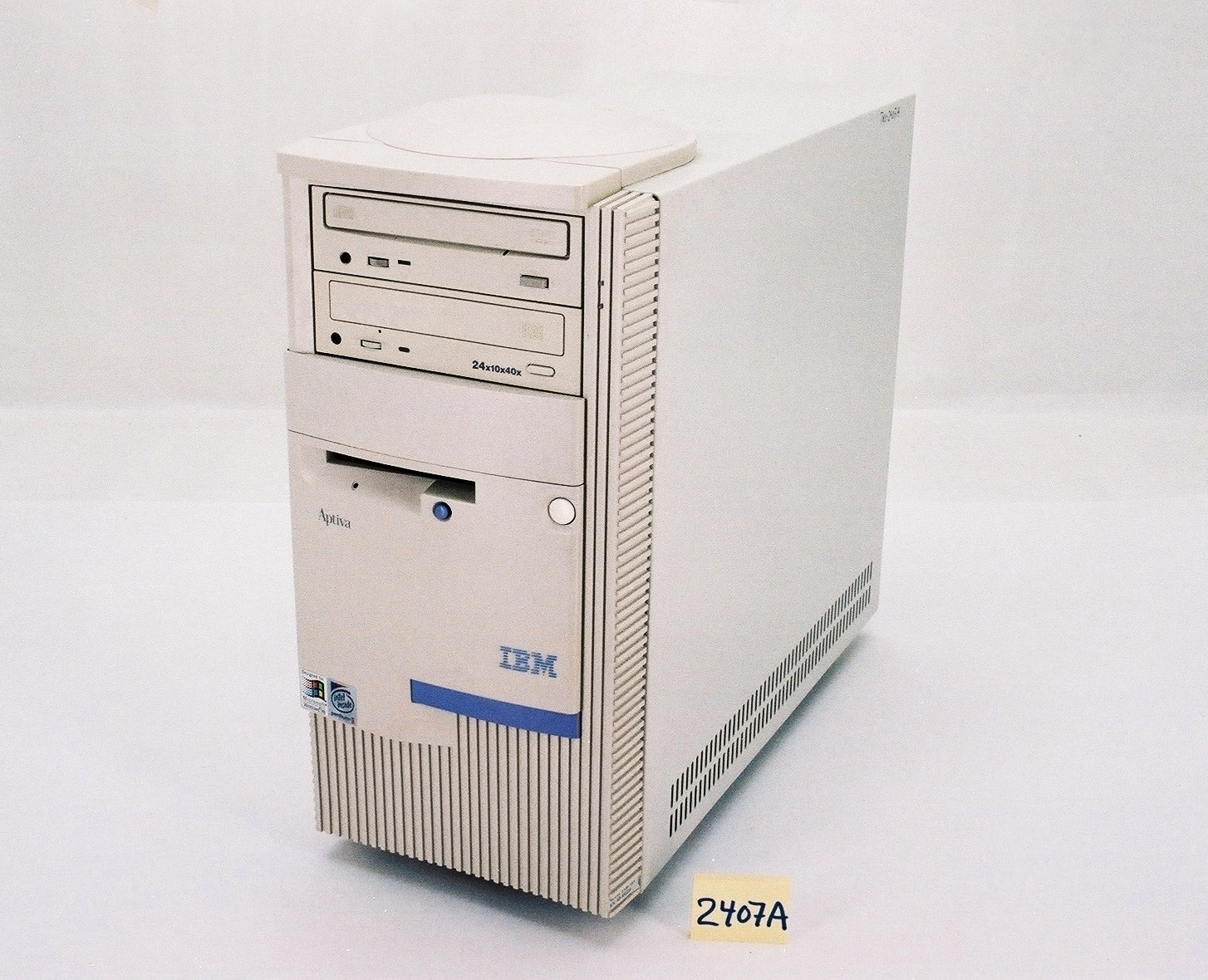
IBM Aptiva 2136, 2137, 2138, 2139

The series to which a Pentium-based Aptiva belongs is encoded in the first letter of the three-character model number (so a 2168-M40 is an M Series). The word in quotes relates to the internal development name for the computer.

- A Series Followed the M series Aptiva. Also used Mwave adaptor and Windows 95.
- C Series "Courageous" There were two model types and followed A series Aptiva.
- E Series "Entry" Low-end models developed by Acer alongside the ThinkPad i Series.
- L Series
- M Series "Magic" First Aptiva series preloaded with Windows 95. Also used Mwave adaptor
- S Series "Stealth" This model appeared during the C series introduction and used Mwave also.

Aptiva machine types:

- 2136, 2137, 2138, 2139
- 2140, 2142, 2144
- 2151-89E, 2151-90E, 2153, 2156, 2158, 2159
- 2161, 2162, 2163, 2164, 2168,
- 2170 (AMD K6-2), 2171, 2172, 2173, 2174, 2176, 2178
- 2193, 2194, 2196, 2197, 2198
- 2255
- 2270, 2274
- 6832
- 6864

The first generation of Aptivas used the 2144 desktop and 2168 tower unit form factors. The 2159 "stealth" series was a unique all black design that had the monitor resting on a metal stand with a 'console' located underneath which contained the floppy and CD drive. The console connected to the main unit via a 6-foot cable. Later in the production life, all Aptivas used tower unit form factors. Originally the 2144 and 2168 machine types referred to the amount of open slots and drive bays. Later machine type numbers did not have the same nomenclature.

== User groups ==
Various Aptiva user and fan groups emerged. One of the most notable and tenured was run by Don Schneider, "DON5408's Unofficial Aptiva Support Site", now available on aptivasupport.com. The site had much information on topics such as how to open the computer case, drivers and upgrade tips. The site included a user chat group on Friday nights for users to help each other with PC issues. The site was removed when AOL discontinued its web hosting services, but some pages still remain on ptd.net. The site ran from April 4, 1997 to October 31, 2008, bringing in just under a million views on the home page.

== Timeline ==
Timeline of the IBM Personal Computer

Asterisk (*) denotes a model released in Japan only

== See also ==
- Ambra Computer Corporation
- IBM PC Series
- ThinkPad
