= PlayStation Classic =

Dedicated video game console

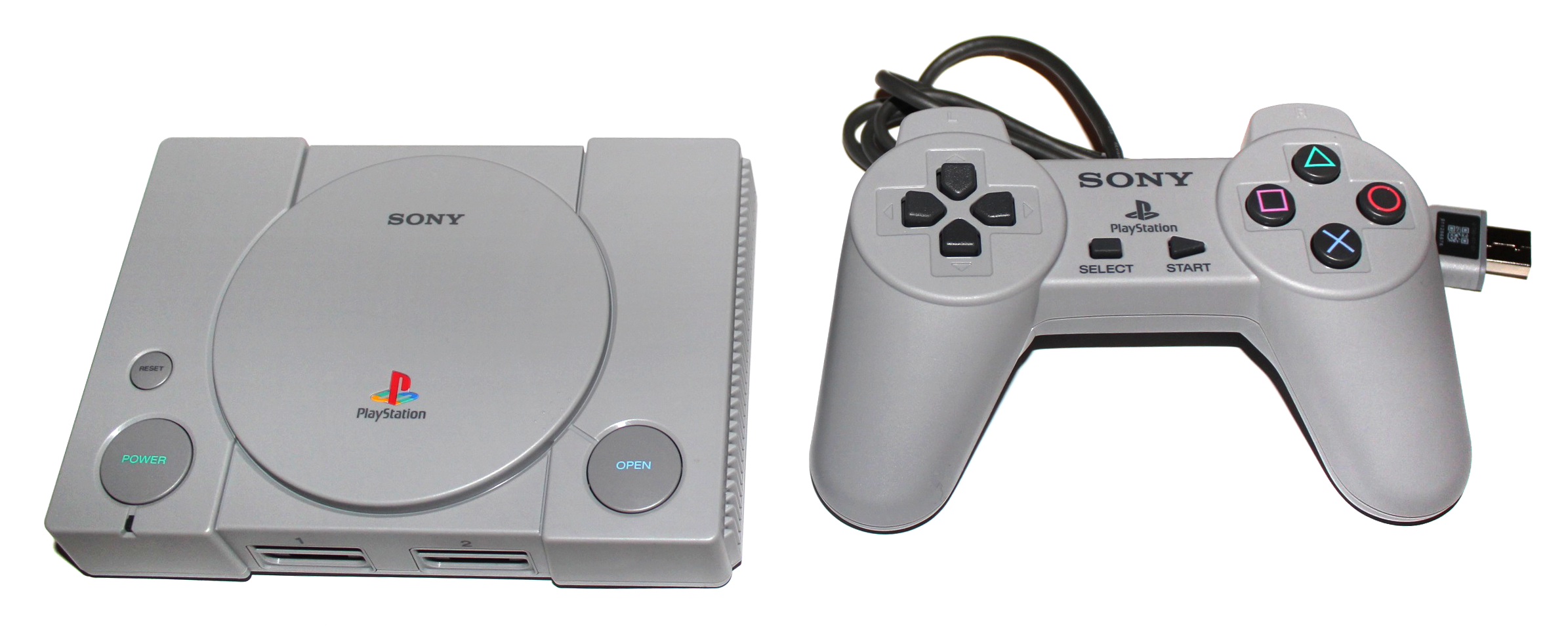
- PlayStation Classic console and controller
- Also known as: PSC; PS Classic; PS1 Classic
- Developer: Sony Interactive Entertainment
- Manufacturer: Sony Electronics
- Product family: PlayStation
- Type: Dedicated console
- Released: WW: December 3, 2018
- Introductory price: US$99.99 €99.99 ¥9,980 £89.99; A$149.99; CA$129.99
- Media: Internal flash memory
- Operating system: Linux
- System on a chip: MediaTek MT8167A
- CPU: Quad-Core ARM Cortex-A35
- Memory: 1 GB DDR3
- Storage: 16 GB eMMC
- Graphics: Power VR GE8300
- Controller input: 2 controller ports PlayStation Classic controller
- Connectivity: microUSB
- Dimensions: 149 × 33 × 105 mm (5.9 × 1.3 × 4.1 in)
- Weight: 170 g (6.0 oz)
- Website: playstation.com/en-us/explore/playstation-classic

The PlayStation Classic is a dedicated video game console by Sony Interactive Entertainment that emulates games originally released on its 1994 PlayStation console. It was announced in September 2018 at the Tokyo Game Show and released on December 3, 2018, the 24th anniversary of the release of the original. The console has been compared to competitor Nintendo's prior releases of the NES Classic Edition and Super NES Classic Edition mini consoles. The console received generally negative reviews from critics, with criticism for its weak game library, inclusion of the original PlayStation controller instead of later, upgraded revisions, use of PAL versions for certain games, and high price tag, though the console's design did attract praise.

== Specifications ==
The PlayStation Classic ships with two replica PlayStation controllers (the original model without the analog sticks and vibration), an HDMI cable, and a USB Micro-A to standard USB-A cable. An AC adapter for the console is sold separately. The console weighs about 170 grams (0.37 lb) and is about 149 mm × 33 mm × 105 mm (5.9 in × 1.3 in × 4.1 in) in size, approximately 80% smaller in volume than the original PlayStation and 45% smaller in width and length. It includes ports for both controllers, HDMI output, and power via USB.

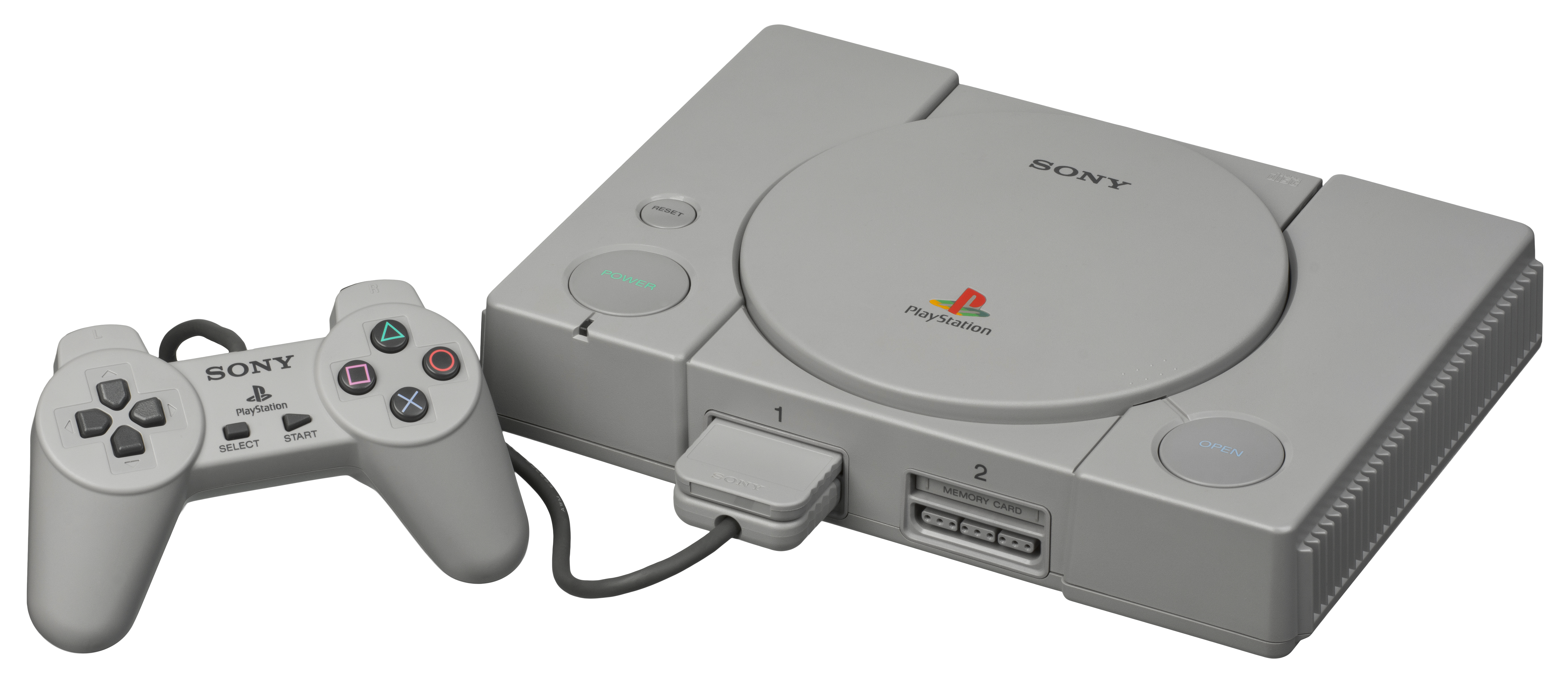
The original PlayStation game console. PlayStation Classic is a "minified version" of the machine, and its appearance is almost identical.

The controller's cords measure approximately 1.5 metres (4.9 ft) long. The controllers use a USB interface. The console has 2 USB ports in the front for the 2 controllers that are included. It cannot use PlayStation memory cards. Internally, the console uses a MediaTek MT8167a Quad A35 system on a chip with four central processing cores clocked at @ 1.5 GHz and a Power VR GE8300 graphics processing unit. It includes 16 GB of eMMC flash storage and 1 GB of DDR3 memory.

The Classic uses the ReARMed branch of the free and open source emulator PCSX to play its games instead of Sony's proprietary emulator.

There exists a retro receiver (8Bitdo) for PS1 and PS2 for purchase, to connect with a modern gamepad.

== Games ==
The PlayStation Classic comes preloaded with 20 games, running off the open source emulator, PCSX ReARMed. Five games were revealed when the console was announced, and the full roster was revealed a month later. Eight games vary between regions. The device does not interface with the PlayStation Network, and games will not be added post-launch. Each game can be suspended in a save state by pressing the console's "reset" button. Nine games use the PAL release (favored in most European countries) regardless of the console's release platform, which means they run at a slower frame rate of 50 Hz as opposed to the NTSC standard of 60 Hz (favored in North America, parts of Japan, as well as some other Asian countries), and may respond slower than players from NTSC regions would expect.

The North American version of the dedicated console received an M for Mature rating from the ESRB due to the inclusion of Grand Theft Auto, Metal Gear Solid and Resident Evil: Director's Cut. Likewise, the European version received an 18 rating from the PEGI group; European package also displays German USK 16 (PEGI ratings are not formally recognized in Germany) and Australian MA 15+ ratings as it is also sold in Australia (another PAL territory). Although the system box recommends the system for all ages, and some individual titles such as Mr. Driller and Rayman have suitable ratings for that age group, the console provides access to all 20 games with no parental controls or settings to restrict available games.

Games	Publisher	NA/PAL/Korea/SEA	Japan/TW/HK
Arc the Lad	Sony Interactive Entertainment	No	Yes
Arc the Lad II	Sony Interactive Entertainment	No	Yes
Armored Core	FromSoftware	No	Yes
Battle Arena Toshinden ^{PAL}	Tomy	Yes	Yes
Cool Boarders 2 ^{PAL}	UEP Systems	Yes	No
Destruction Derby ^{PAL}	Sony Interactive Entertainment	Yes	No
Devil Dice	Sony Interactive Entertainment	No	Yes
Final Fantasy VII (Note: The Japanese console uses the western version of Final Fantasy VII, titled Final Fantasy VII International.)	Square Enix	Yes	Yes
G-Darius	Taito	No	Yes
Gradius Gaiden	Konami	No	Yes
Grand Theft Auto ^{PAL}	Rockstar Games	Yes	No
Intelligent Qube	Sony Interactive Entertainment	Yes	Yes
Jumping Flash! ^{PAL}	Sony Interactive Entertainment	Yes	Yes
Metal Gear Solid	Konami	Yes	Yes
Mr. Driller	Bandai Namco Entertainment	Yes	Yes
Oddworld: Abe's Oddysee ^{PAL}	Oddworld Inhabitants	Yes	No
Parasite Eve	Square Enix	No	Yes
R4: Ridge Racer Type 4	Bandai Namco Entertainment	Yes	Yes
Rayman	Ubisoft	Yes	No
Resident Evil: Director's Cut ^{PAL} (Note: Resident Evil: Director's Cut was titled Bio Hazard: Director's Cut in Japan.)	Capcom	Yes	Yes
Revelations: Persona	Atlus	Yes	Yes
SaGa Frontier	Square Enix	No	Yes
Super Puzzle Fighter II Turbo (Note: Super Puzzle Fighter II Turbo was titled Super Puzzle Fighter II X in Japan.)	Capcom	Yes	Yes
Syphon Filter	Sony Interactive Entertainment	Yes	No
Tekken 3 ^{PAL}	Bandai Namco Entertainment	Yes	Yes
Tom Clancy's Rainbow Six ^{PAL}	Ubisoft	Yes	No
Twisted Metal	Sony Interactive Entertainment	Yes	No
Wild Arms	Sony Interactive Entertainment	Yes	Yes

Final Fantasy VII, Jumping Flash!, Ridge Racer Type 4, Tekken 3, and Wild Arms were first announced on September 18, 2018, ahead of the full game list reveal on October 29, 2018.
^ PAL. These games use the PAL releases in the international version and run at 50 Hz, compared to the 60 Hz of NTSC releases.

== Reception ==
Reception

Review scores
Publication	Score
GamesRadar+	3.5/5
IGN	5.5/10

The PlayStation Classic received generally negative reviews from critics overall, with criticism being directed at the game line up, lack of popular titles, the use of PAL versions for certain titles, the use of the original controller, which lacked analog sticks and vibration, and the $100 price tag, although its design received praise. Most reviewers criticized the exclusion of many popular PlayStation titles, such as Wipeout, Crash Bandicoot, Spyro the Dragon, Tony Hawk's Pro Skater, Tomb Raider, PaRappa the Rapper, Klonoa: Door to Phantomile, Gran Turismo, Castlevania: Symphony of the Night, The Legend of Dragoon, Legacy of Kain: Soul Reaver, MediEvil, and Silent Hill. Tristan Ogilive of IGN criticised the console's lack of popular titles, the basic user-interface and pointing out that "almost half of the games included in the PlayStation Classic's library are the PAL versions" which caused consistency problems in NTSC regions. Sam Loveridge of GamesRadar+ praised the look of the console, but criticized the selection of games, the weak presentation of the games due to the black bars on the side of the screen, and the short length of the controller cables.

The lower frame rates during gameplay, poor emulation quality, and the user interface were also criticized. John Linneman of Eurogamer's Digital Foundry also gave it a similarly negative review, noting the console's subpar emulation, poor image quality, lack of enhancements and use of PAL game releases on North American units, though he did praise the user interface. Chris Carter of Destructoid shares a similar opinion, citing that the emulation on the classic console is at times, "worse than the original", but praised the instant-state recovery and the size of the internal storage. Joe Juba of Game Informer lamented on the lack of analog sticks on the controller, along with the lacking selection of titles and a barebones menu, which makes the system a good fit only for an "extremely specific audience". However, Twisted Metal, Jumping Flash!, Tekken 3, Final Fantasy VII, and Metal Gear Solid were hailed as the best of the genre.

In response to the console's perceived weak game selection, many users have modified the console to play ROMs via external storage, essentially turning the console into a dedicated emulator, similar to software such as Retropie.

=== Sales ===
The PlayStation Classic had sold 120,000 units during its first week in Japan. Its sales were noticeably low in the U.S. (within the first four weeks over Christmas) with many retailers and websites, such as Amazon, giving discounts for the console as low as US$60 in several major U.S. retailers. Reasons for the price drop at this time suggested a combination of overproduction of the unit, over-pricing on the original cost of the unit, or disinterest in the unit, which had been panned by journalists. Just over two months after its release, the console was further discounted by Walmart to US$40. Another price drop to US$29.99, €29.99 and £26.99 in all U.S., European and U.K. retailers respectively followed in June 2019, as part of PlayStation's "Days of Play" sale events. In July 2019, Best Buy and Amazon began selling the console as low as US$20.
