= RPCS3 =

Emulator for PlayStation 3 software

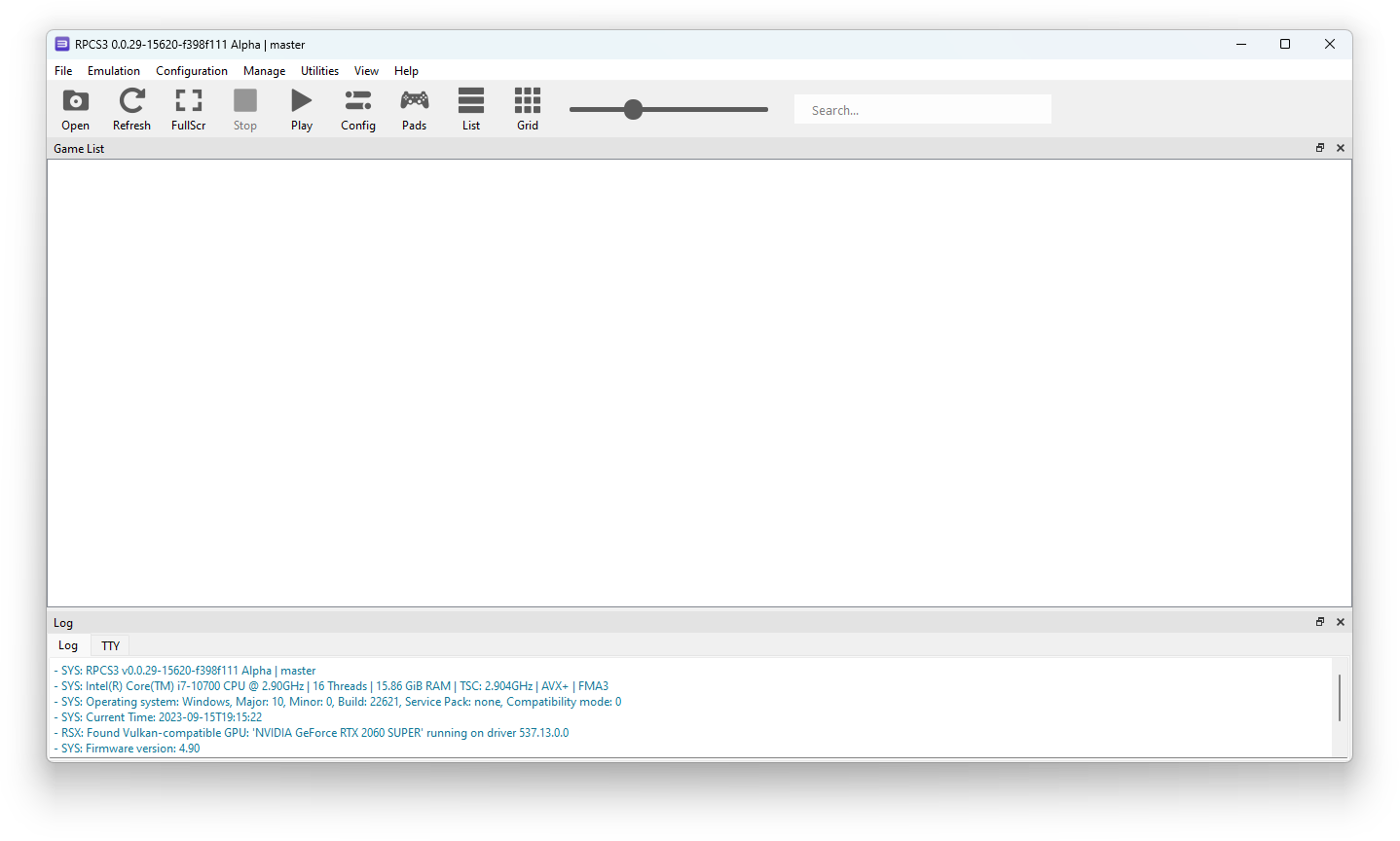
- RPCS3 running on Windows 11
- Original authors: DH, Hykem, AlexAltea
- Developers: (RPCS3 TEAM) Nekotekina, kd-11, elad335, jarveson, Megamouse, hcorion, scribam, ruipin, isJuhn, Galciv, Numan
- Release: May 23, 2011; 15 years ago
- Stable release: None
- Preview release: 0.0.39-18703 Alpha / January 16, 2026; 9 months ago
- Written in: C++, C and GLSL
- Operating system: Windows, macOS, Linux, FreeBSD
- Platform: x86-64, ARM64
- Available in: English
- Type: Video game console emulator
- License: GNU General Public License version 2.0
- Website: rpcs3.net
- Repository: github.com/rpcs3/rpcs3/

RPCS3 (Russian Personal Computer Station 3) is a free and open-source emulator and debugger for the Sony PlayStation 3 that runs on Windows, Linux, FreeBSD and macOS operating systems, allowing PlayStation 3 games and software to be played and debugged on a personal computer. It is in active development, targeting x86-64 and ARM64 (Note: For macOS devices.) CPUs featuring OpenGL and Vulkan as backend renderers.

As of October 21, 2026, 80% of PlayStation 3 games have been classified as "playable", meaning that a significant portion of the native library can be played from start to finish without any major problems.

== Development ==
Despite the general idea that the complexity of the PlayStation 3's Cell architecture would prevent it from being emulated, RPCS3 released on May 23, 2011, by programmers DH and Hykem as a working emulator. The developers initially hosted the project on Google Code and eventually moved it to GitHub on August 27, 2013. The emulator was first able to successfully run simple homebrew projects in September 2011 and got its first public release in June 2012 as v0.0.0.2.

On February 9, 2017, RPCS3 received its first implementation of a PPE thread scheduler, enhancing its emulation of the many-core Cell microprocessor. On February 16, 2017, RPCS3 gained the ability to install official PlayStation 3 firmware directly to its core file system. In May 2017, it was reported that the implementation of the Vulkan graphics API had shown some performance improvements approaching 400%, pushing several games into "playable" status.

In July 2022, the developers of RPCS3 implemented save states into the emulator. This feature had previously been considered infeasible due to technical limitations.

In September 2024, a build of RPCS3 native to the ARM64 CPU architecture for macOS devices with Apple silicon system-on-chip was released on GitHub.

On November 17, 2025, TSX support was removed from RPCS3 due to it being unmaintained.

== Requirements ==
As of early 2026, the OS requirements are:

- Windows: 10 or later.
- macOS: Sonoma (14.4) or later.
- Linux: 6.6 or later, Ubuntu 22.04 or later.
- FreeBSD: 13.5 or later.

The PC must have at least 8 GB of RAM minimum, 16 GB recommended, an x86-64 CPU and a GPU supporting one of the supported graphics APIs: OpenGL 4.3 or greater, or Vulkan, the latter being recommended. Additional support for SIMD CPU instruction sets such as AVX-2 and AVX-512 is also recommended for best performance. Apart from the game itself to be run, the emulator requires the PlayStation 3's firmware, which can be downloaded from Sony's official website.

== Legal challenges ==
RPCS3 received significant media attention in April 2017 for its ability to emulate Persona 5, achieving playability prior to the game's Western release date. In September 2017, Persona developer Atlus issued a DMCA takedown notice against RPCS3's Patreon page. The action was motivated by the Patreon page making frequent mentions on the emulator's progress on emulating Persona 5. The demand, however, was settled by only removing all Persona 5 references from the page.

== See also ==
- PCSX2, a PlayStation 2 emulator.
- ShadPS4, a PlayStation 4 emulator.
- Dolphin (emulator), a GameCube and Wii emulator.
- Cemu, the first Wii U emulator
- Citra, the first Nintendo 3DS emulator
- List of video game emulators
