= Panther XL =

Video game controller

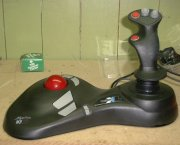

The Panther XL by Mad Catz is a joystick and trackball combination that is used to replace the keyboard and mouse for player movement in first-person shooter games like Quake and Unreal. it could also be used for flight simulators so players can point their ship in any direction with the trackball. Based on a patent by James Barnes of First-Person Gaming, the Panther XL used technology used in the Assassin 3D controller.

The Panther XL began production in late 1996 and was produced until 1998 with two main revisions in hardware in that timeframe. The controller remains popular with its fan base including many upgrades to the units functionality and internal workings to make the controller work in contemporary games and computers.
