= PCSX-Reloaded =

Video game console emulator

PCSX
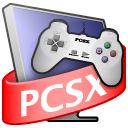

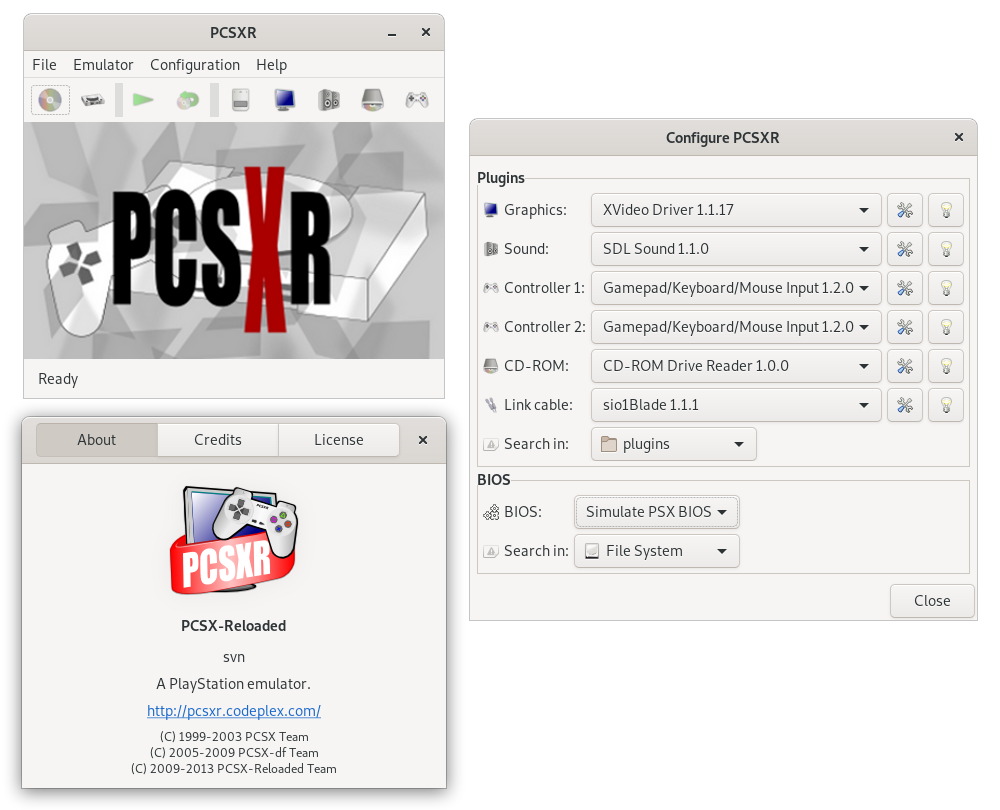
- PCSXR 1.9.94 (running on Linux and GNOME)
- Original authors: Nocomp, George Moralis ("Shadow"), Linuzappz
- Developers: PCSX Team, PCSX-df Team, PCSX-Reloaded Team
- Stable release: 1.9.95 / August 26, 2013
- Preview release: Snapshot
- Written in: C (GTK on Linux)
- Operating system: Unix-like, Microsoft Windows, macOS
- Type: Console emulator
- License: GNU General Public License
- Website: pcsxr.codeplex.com
- Repository: https://github.com/iCatButler/pcsxr

PCSX is a free and open-source, video game console emulator that allows software designed to be used with the Sony PlayStation to run on personal computers. Over the years, development changed hands several times with PCSX-Reloaded (PCSXR) now being the main version. As of 2021, the emulator seems to be no longer under active development. A newer, actively maintained fork of PCSX-Reloaded is PCSX-Redux.

PCSX has a high compatibility rate, and is currently available for a number of different operating systems including, Microsoft Windows, macOS, and Linux. It is released under the GNU General Public License.

== History ==
Development for the emulator started on July 20, 1999, The emulator was first released for the PC on August 31, 2000. Official development ceased on September 17, 2003, and development shifted to the new PlayStation 2 emulator, PCSX2.

PCSX-df was created in 2006 and added new features, a new GTK-based interface, AMD64 support, and corrected some bugs, but was developed mainly with only Linux compatibility in mind. Version 1.10 was released on March 29, 2009.

PCSX-Reloaded is a new project created in mid-2009, which is based on the work of the PCSX-df branch, completely independent, and works on bug fixes while maintaining Windows and OS X compatibility alongside Linux. PCSX-df and PCSX-Reloaded coexisted for a while, with PCSX-df merging changes of PCSX-Reloaded back into df.

In 2019, another fork PCSX-Redux was started. It can be seen as the latest iteration of the original PCSX codebase. This fork has the goal of a complete redesign along more up to date code standards. Everything should be implemented on top of OpenGL3+/ImGui. Additionally, the plugin system will be replaced through a single monolithic codebase that handles all aspects of the PlayStation emulation. In this context, PCSX-Redux shares several approaches with the PlayStation 2 emulation successor project PCSX2.

== Features ==
PCSX supports network play and external plugins as used by ePSXe. As with many modern emulators, PCSX-Reloaded supports savestates and also has Save Rewind feature (currently only OSX and Linux version), Support for ECM files (currently only OS X and Linux version), Support for Libarchive (currently only OSX and Linux version), widescreen hack and makes use of plug-ins to emulate GPU, SPU, and CD-ROM drive functions, a model first established in PSEmu Pro, it uses Peops OpenGL plugin for graphics on default but can also use Pete's OpenGL2, gpuBladeSoft, PCSX2 graphics plugin GSDX, AmiDog GPU plugin, Asmodeans PSXFX shader pack, input plugins such as Lilypad and Pokopom Pad Plugin. It also has multi-track cue support and is the only PS1 emulator with compatibility with anti-jitter options in graphics plugins, such as GTE accuracy in the default Peops OpenGL plugin, or Improved coordinate accuracy in Edgbla's gpuBladeSoft and it also supports PeteOpenGL2Tweak plugin. Additionally, PCSX seeks to simulate the functionality of the PlayStation BIOS and consequently does not require a BIOS file dump to operate, making it easier to emulate legally, however, Bios emulation is still incomplete so it is better to use dumped BIOS to avoid various bugs and reduced compatibility.

== Ports and commercial usage ==
Linux, macOS/OS X, and Microsoft Windows on x86-based computers are the main development focus of PCSX-Reloaded but various PCSX iterations have been ported to other platforms as well, including Dreamcast, GameCube, PlayStation 3, Wii, Xbox, and various ARM-based platforms (PCSX-Rearmed fork) such as BlackBerry Playbook and Nintendo 3DS.

=== Usage ===
PCSXR was used for an official port and commercial re-release of N2O: Nitrous Oxide on Steam on June 29, 2015. It is also used as the emulator on Sony's PlayStation Classic dedicated console.

== Reception ==
Tom's Guide featured PCSX Reloaded in a feature about the best PlayStation emulators, scoring it at 4 of 5 points. Kator Legaz reviewed the Mac OS version as "good".

== See also ==
- PCSX2
- Mednafen
