= IBM PS/1 =

IBM home computer models, 1990–1994

PS/1
- Also known as: PS/1000 (Europe)
- Type: Personal computer
- Released: August 1990
- Discontinued: 1994
- Predecessor: PCjr
- Successor: Aptiva
- Related: PS/2

The PS/1 (known in some European countries as the PS/1000) is a brand for a line of personal computers that marked IBM's return to the home market in 1990, five years after the IBM PCjr. It was replaced by the IBM Aptiva in September 1994.

== Position among IBM's PC brands ==
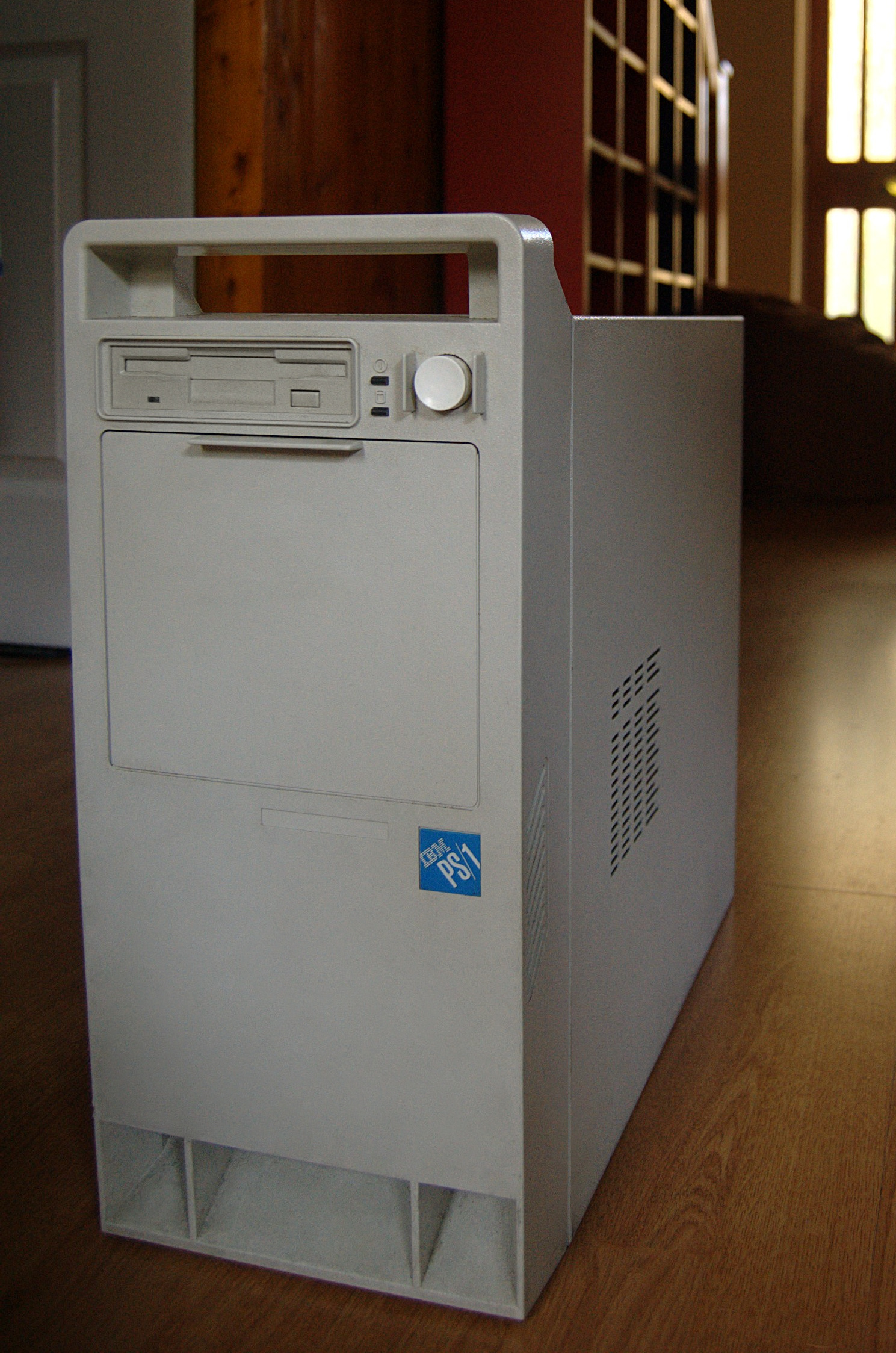
IBM PS/1 2168

The PS/1 line was created for new computer users and was sold in consumer electronics stores alongside comparable offerings from Compaq, Hewlett-Packard, Packard Bell, and others. American PS/1 models came with a modem installed so users could access online IBM help services, which were provided by partnerships with Prodigy and Quantum Computer Services.

Like the PCjr, the PS/1's name suggested a more limited machine than IBM's business line, the PS/2. However, unlike the PS/2, the PS/1 was based upon architecture closer to the AT and compatibles, for example using ISA, plain VGA, and IDE. Although the first models used custom-designed components and design, later desktop and tower models used mostly standard components. The earlier models included a ROM with IBM's PC DOS and a graphical shell, however the system was compatible with other DOS implementations and the shell could be installed on the hard drive. Later models included a feature called "Rapid Resume" which gave the computers the ability to go into standby mode as well as a hibernation function. There were several form factors used during the PS/1's production, with the 2133 and 2155 cases used for several model years, while the 2168 tower case was offered later in later models of the PS/1 lineup:

- 2011 Proprietary design, power supply is within CRT
- 2121 Proprietary design, power supply is within CRT, up to two available ISA slots
- 2123 Limited-production model. Based on IBM PS/2 model 30 case, three available ISA slots
- 2133 Desktop case. The 3x3 references the available slots and drive bays.
- 2155 Desktop case larger than 2133. The 5x5 references the available slots and drive bays, including a 5.25" bay.
- 2168 Tower unit. The 6x8 references the available slots and bays, including 5.25" bays.

== Models ==
=== Models 2011 ===
IBM PS/1 (model 2011)
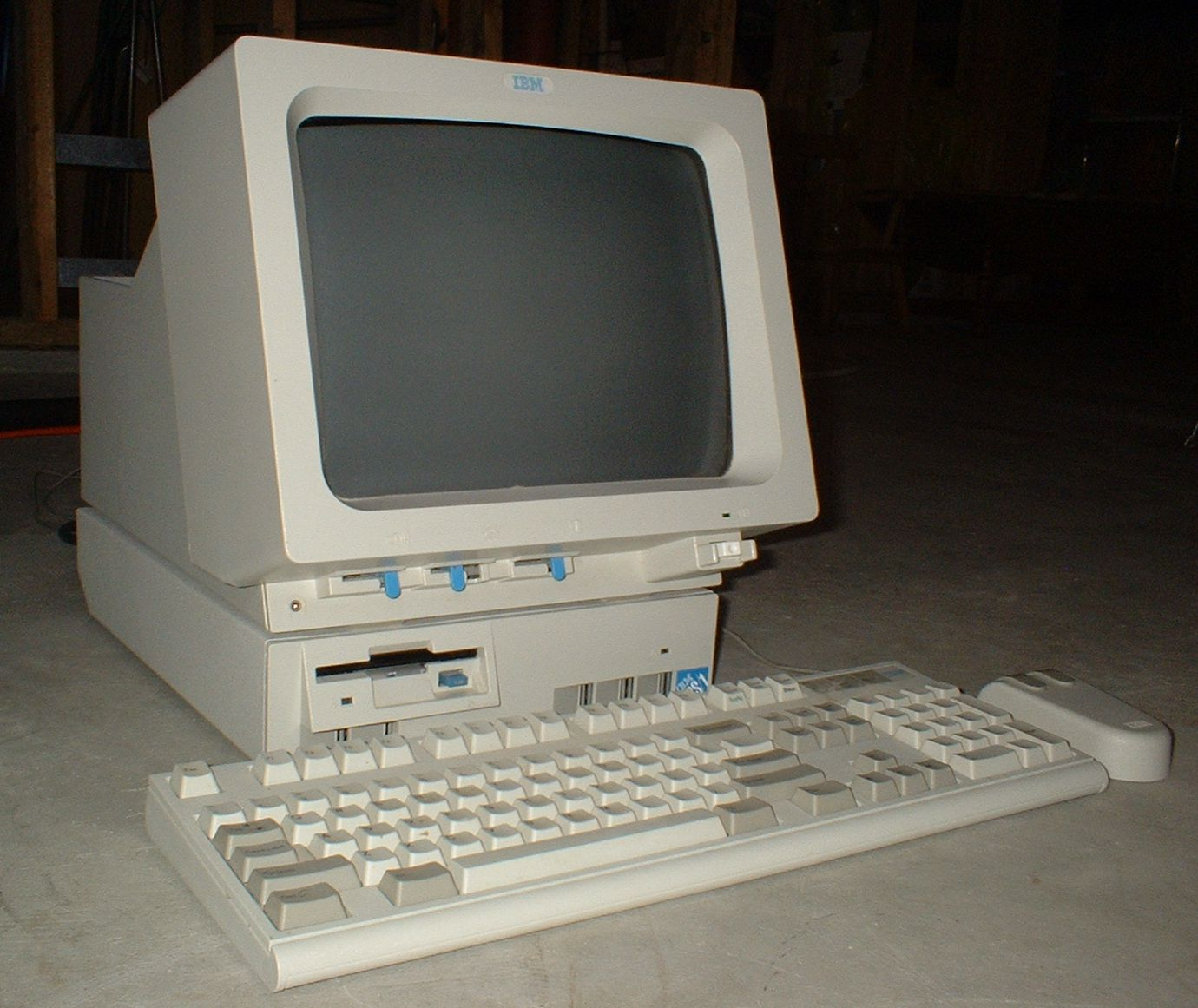
- Released: 1990; 36 years ago
- Operating system: PC DOS 4.01 (in ROM)
- CPU: Intel 80286 @ 10 MHz
- Memory: 512 KB – 2.5 MB

The original PS/1 (Model 2011), based on a 10 MHz Intel 80286 CPU, was designed to be easy to set up and use. It featured 512 KB or 1 MB of on-board memory (expandable to 2.5 MB with proprietary memory modules), built-in modem (in American models only) and an optional 30 MB hard disk. Later models had an optional 40 MB hard disk. IBM also released a 5.25" disk drive unit, a $169 expansion box called Adapter Card Unit (ACU) that could hold three 8/16-bit ISA third-party expansion cards. A $995 CD-ROM drive, based on a Western Digital SCSI chip, could be fitted underneath the case. The first generation of PS/1 models suffered from very limited expansion capabilities, since they lacked standard ISA expansion slots, without the expansion box (ACU). However, up to three 512 KB memory cards could be easily installed, for $199 each. The original offering was 4 models:

- $999 VGA Mono (640 × 480), 512 KB RAM
- $1.499 VGA Color (640 × 480), 512 KB RAM
- $1.699 VGA Mono (640 × 480), 1 MB RAM, 30 MB hard disk
- $1.999 VGA Color (640 × 480), 1 MB RAM, 30 MB hard disk

=== Model 2121 ===
IBM PS/1 (model 2121)
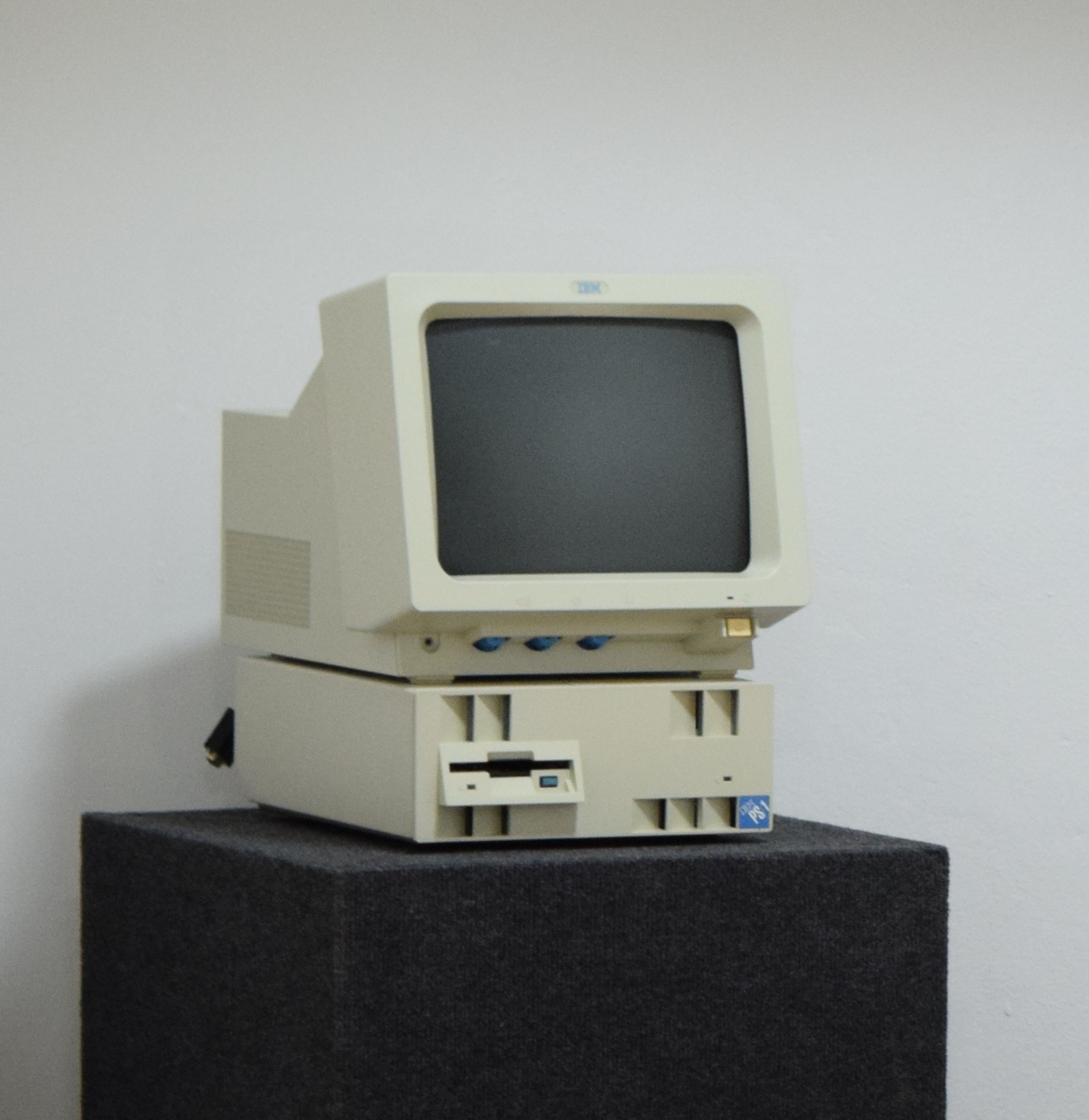
- Released: 1992
- Discontinued: 1993
- Operating system: PC DOS 4.01 (in ROM)
- CPU: Intel 80386SX @ 16–20 MHz
- Memory: 2–6 MB

The 2121 series computers used the same form factor as the 2011 series, but included up to two ISA slots inside the case. Memory could be expanded from 2 MB to 6 MB using a proprietary 4 MB memory module. The higher-end 2121 featured an Intel 80386SX processor running at 16 or 20 MHz.

The 2121 series PS/1 computers can be split into the following major hardware categories:

Model	US list	MB FRU	CPU	ISA slots	RAM	VRAM	Hard drive	Serial / modem
2121-C42	$1,699	92F9690	Intel 80386SX @ 16 MHz	0	2 MB	256 KB	95F4720 (40 MB IDE)	2400-baud modem
2121-B82	$2,199	92F9690	Intel 80386SX @ 16 MHz	2	2 MB	256 KB	92F9943 (80 MB IDE)	2400-baud modem
2121-C92	?	?	Intel 80386SX @ 16 MHz	0	2 MB	256 KB	129 MB IDE	2400-baud modem
2121-NE3	?	92F9673	Intel 80386SX @ 16 MHz	2	?	?	95F4722 (80 MB IDE)	2400-baud modem
2121-G42	?	93F2184	Intel 80386SX @ 20 MHz	0	2 MB	256 KB	40 MB IDE	2400-baud modem
2121-A82	?	?	Intel 80386SX @ 20 MHz	2	2 MB	256 KB	40 MB IDE	2400 baud modem
2121-S92	?	?	Intel 80386SX @ 20 MHz	0	2 MB	256 KB	129 MB IDE	2400-baud modem
2121-M82	?	?	Intel 80386SX @ 20 MHz	2	2 MB	256 KB	80 MB IDE	2400-baud modem
2121-A62	?	?	?	2	?	256 KB	56F8863 (160 MB IDE)	2400-baud modem
2121-A92	N/A (Note: International-market variant distributed primarily by IBM Canada and IBM Europe. Omitted the internal modem for a physical 25-pin RS-232 serial port and lacked a United States retail release.)	92F9663	Intel 80386SX @ 16 MHz	2	2 MB	256 KB	40 MB IDE	25-pin RS-232 serial port
2121-A94	?	?	Intel 80386SX @ 20 MHz	2	6 MB	256 KB	129 MB IDE	2400-baud modem

Monitors: IBM made the decision to put the DC power supply in the monitor, making use of third-party monitors difficult and essentially impractical and limiting the usefulness of the computer if the monitor needed service (similar to the problems of the Coleco Adam and Amstrad 1512 years earlier). Some models were sold with greyscale VGA monitors. However, some hobbyists could manage to remap the pinouts to allow for third-party monitors.

"DOS in ROM”: Similar to a few Tandy 1000 models, the early 2011 and 2121 had an operating system (PC DOS 4.01) built into ROM, rather than loading it from a hard drive. The ROM disk would then load a "4-quad" screen which allowed users to access help, rapidly launch pre-installed software, connect online, and access files on the hard drive. It was possible to have the computer boot from the hard drive if the operating system was upgraded, and IBM provided a DOS 6.22-compatible version of the "4-quad" program that could be launched from the hard drive if users wished to continue using it.

=== Model 2133 ===
IBM PS/1 (model 2133)
- Released: 1992
- Discontinued: 1993
- Operating system: PC DOS 4.01 or OS/2 v2.1
- CPU: Intel 80386SX @ 25 MHz or 80486SX @ 20 MHz or 80486SX @ 25 MHz or 80486DX @ 33 MHz or 80486DX2 @ 50 MHz
- Memory: 2–16 MB (2–4 MB on-board)

The 2133 series PS/1 computers can be split into the following major hardware categories:

Model	MB FRU	CPU	RAM	SIMM	Video chip	VRAM	Hard drive	Notes
2133-111	32G1768	Intel 80386SX @ 25 MHz	2 MB	2 × 72-pin FPM	Cirrus CL-GD5410	256 KB	95F7173 (80 MB IDE)	
2133–711	93F2397	Intel 80386SX @ 25 MHz	2 MB	2 × 72-pin FPM	Cirrus CL-GD5410	256 KB	59G9567 (85 MB IDE)	
2133–811		Intel 80386SX @ 25 MHz	4 MB				85 MB IDE	
2133–13	?	Intel 80386SX @ 25 MHz	2 MB	2 × 72-pin FPM		256 KB	?	
2133-W13		Intel 80386SX @ 25 MHz	2 MB				129 MB IDE	
2133-13T	65G3766	Intel 80486SX @ 25 MHz	4 MB	2 × 72-pin FPM		256 KB	93F2329 (129 MB IDE)	
2133-?43	34G1885	Intel 80486SX @ 20 MHz	4 MB	2 × 30-pin FPM		512 KB	93F2329 (129 MB IDE)	
2133-?50	34G1848	Intel 80486SX @ 25 MHz	4 MB	2 × 30-pin FPM		512 KB	93F2329 (129 MB IDE)	
2133-?53	34G1848	Intel 80486SX @ 25 MHz	4 MB	2 × 30-pin FPM		512 KB	93F2329 (129 MB IDE)	
2133–652		Intel 80486SX @ 33 MHz	4 MB	4 × 72-pin FPM	Cirrus CL-GD5424	512 KB	84G3927 (171 MB IDE)	
2133–575		Intel 80486DX @ 33 MHz	4 MB	4 × 72-pin FPM		512 KB	170 MB IDE	
2133–594		Intel 80486DX2 @ 66 MHz	4 MB	4 × 72-pin FPM		512 KB	253 MB IDE	
2133-E11		Intel 80386SX @ 25 MHz	2 MB	2 × 72-pin FPM	Cirrus CL-GD5424	512 KB	85 MB IDE	Canada models, English model
2133-F11		Intel 80386SX @ 25 MHz	2 MB	2 × 72-pin FPM	Cirrus CL-GD5424	512 KB	85 MB IDE	Canada models, French model
2133-E43		Intel 80486SX @ 20 MHz	2 MB	8 × 30-pin FPM	Tseng ET4000	512 KB	129 MB IDE	Canada models, English model
2133-F43		Intel 80486SX @ 20 MHz	2 MB	8 × 30-pin FPM	Tseng ET4000	512 KB	129 MB IDE	Canada models, French model
2133-E53		Intel 80486SX @ 25 MHz	2 MB	8 × 30-pin FPM	Tseng ET4000	512 KB	129 MB IDE	Canada models, English model
2133-F53		Intel 80486SX @ 25 MHz	2 MB	8 × 30-pin FPM	Tseng ET4000	512 KB	129 MB IDE	Canada models, French model

=== Model 2168 ===
IBM PS/1 (model 2168)
- Released: 1992
- Discontinued: 1993
- Operating system: PC DOS 4.01 or OS/2 v2.1
- CPU: 80486SX @ 25 MHz or 80486SX @ 33 MHz or 80486DX @ 33 MHz or 80486DX @ 50 MHz or 80486DX2 @ 50 MHz or 80486DX2 @ 66 MHz
- Memory: 2–16 MB (2–4 MB on-board)

European models

Model	MB FRU	CPU	RAM	Video chip	VRAM	Hard drive	Notes
2168-452		Intel 80486SX @ 25 MHz	2 MB			85 MB IDE	
2168–463		Intel 80486SX @ 33 MHz	4 MB			130 MB IDE	
2168–473		Intel 80486DX @ 33 MHz	4 MB			130 MB IDE	
2168–483		Intel 80486DX @ 50 MHz	4 MB			129 MB IDE	
2168–493		Intel 80486DX2 @ 66 MHz	4 MB			130 MB IDE	
2168–552		Intel 80486SX @ 25 MHz	4 MB			129 MB IDE	
2168–584		Intel 80486DX2 @ 50 MHz	4 MB			253 MB IDE	
2168–594		Intel 80486DX2 @ 66 MHz	4 MB			253 MB IDE	

US models

Model	MB FRU	CPU	RAM	Video chip	VRAM	Hard drive	Notes
2168-BB1		Intel 80486DX2 @ 66 MHz	4 MB	CL-5428	1 MB	420 MB IDE	
2168-US1		Intel 80486DX2 @ 50 MHz	4 MB	CL-5428	1 MB	340 MB IDE	
2168-SR1		Intel 80486SX @ 33 MHz	4 MB	CL-5428	1 MB	253 MB IDE	
2168-38C		Intel 80486DX2 @ 50 MHz	4 MB	CL-5428	512 KB	340 MB IDE	
2168-57C		Intel 80486DX2 @ 66 MHz	8 MB	CL-5428	1 MB	720 MB IDE	
2168-37C (Consultant) 2168-33T (Expert) 2168-31E (Essential)		Intel 80486DX2 @ 50 MHz	4 MB	CL-5428	512KB	253 MB IDE	
2168-56C (Consultant); 2168-54T (Expert); 2168-51E (Essential)		Intel 80486DX2 @ 66 MHz	8 MB	CL-5428	1 MB	420 MB IDE	
2168-28V (Investor)		Intel 80486SX @ 33 MHz	4 MB	CL-5428	512 KB	253 MB IDE	
2168-58V (Investor)		Intel 80486DX2 @ 66 MHz	8 MB	CL-5428	1 MB	420 MB IDE	
2168-G57 (Consultant); 2168-S55 (Expert); 2168-W52 (Essential)		Intel 80486SX @ 33 MHz	4 MB	CL-5426	1 MB	170 MB IDE	
2168-G87 (Consultant); 2168-S85 (Expert); 2168-W82 (Essential)		Intel 80486DX2 @ 66 MHz	4 MB	CL-5426	1 MB	250 MB IDE	
2168-P89 (Investor)		Intel 80486DX2 @ 66 MHz	4 MB	CL-5426	1 MB	340 MB IDE	

=== Post-"DOS in ROM" models ===
IBM PS/1 (model 2155)
- Released: 1993
- Discontinued: 1994
- Operating system: PC DOS 6.00 / Windows 3.1
- CPU: Intel 80386SX @ 25 MHz, Intel 80486SX @ 20–33 MHz, Intel 80486DX @ 33 MHz, Intel 80486DX2 @ 25–50 MHz
- Memory: 2–64 MB

On May 11, 1993, IBM introduced a "new generation" of the PS/1 line. Later PS/1s featured standard LPX-architecture motherboard. Many of these later PS/1s shipped from the factory with MS-DOS and Microsoft Windows, rather than IBM's PC DOS or OS/2. An early 2133 model did come preloaded with OS/2 2.1. This was because IBM targeted OS/2 for high-end computing machines with more power.

== Discontinuation ==
The PS/1 line was discontinued in 1994 and replaced with the Aptiva line, which was architecturally very similar to the later models of the PS/1, but with a more marketing-friendly name. Aptivas were sold in the United States until early 2000, when price pressures made the line unprofitable and IBM withdrew from the retail desktop PC market entirely.

== Timeline ==
Timeline of the IBM Personal Computer

Asterisk (*) denotes a model released in Japan only
