= PCSX2 =

PlayStation 2 video game console emulator

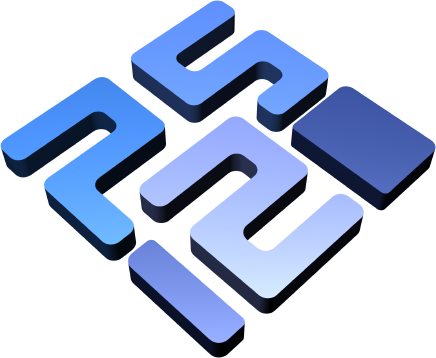

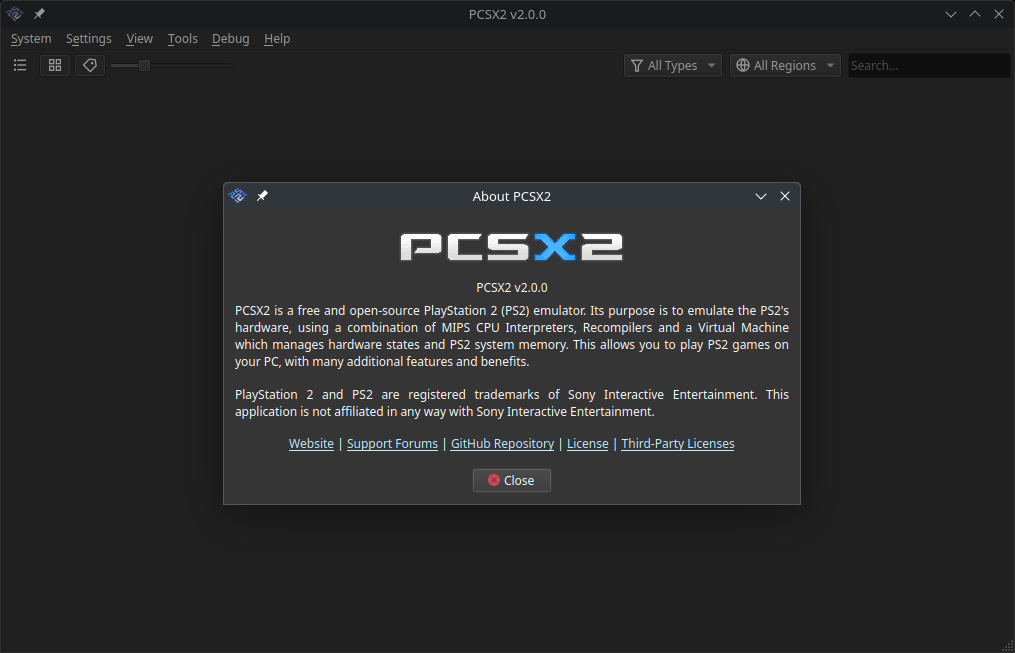
- Screenshot of PCSX2 2.0.0 running on Linux
- Original authors: Linuzappz, George Moralis (AKA Shadow), Refraction, Saqib, Gabest, Gregory, GovanifY, Stenzek, lightningterror, fobes
- Developer: PCSX2 Team
- Release: March 23, 2002; 24 years ago
- Stable release: v2.8.2 / August 28, 2026
- Written in: C++
- Operating system: Windows, Linux, macOS
- Platform: x86-64
- Size: Windows: 42.7 MB; Linux: 56.5 MB; macOS: 98.7 MB
- Available in: 14 languages
- Type: Video game console emulator
- License: Since 0.9.7: GPL-3.0-or-later; Until 0.9.6: GPL-2.0-or-later
- Website: pcsx2.net
- Repository: github.com/PCSX2/pcsx2

PCSX2 is a free and open-source emulator of the PlayStation 2 for x86 computers. It supports most PlayStation 2 video games with a high level of compatibility and functionality, and also supports a number of improvements over gameplay on a traditional PlayStation 2, such as the ability to use higher resolutions than native, anti-aliasing and texture filtering. It has been released for Windows, Linux, and macOS.

== Background ==
PCSX2, like its predecessor project PCSX (a PlayStation emulator), was based on a PSEmu Pro spec plug-in architecture, separating several functions from the core emulator. These are the graphics, audio, input controls, CD/DVD drive, and USB and FireWire (i.LINK) ports. Different plug-ins may produce different results in both compatibility and performance. Additionally, PCSX2 requires a genuine copy of the PS2 BIOS, which is not available for download from the developers due to copyright-related legal issues. Since September 2016, PCSX2 is partially compatible with PlayStation games.

The main bottleneck in PS2 emulation is emulating the Emotion Engine multiprocessor on the PC x86 architecture. Although each processor can be emulated well independently, accurately synchronizing them and emulating the console's timing is difficult.

== Development ==
Development of PCSX2 was started in 2001 by programmers who go by the names Linuzappz and Shadow, who were programmers for the PlayStation emulator PCSX-Reloaded. PCSX2 initially made use of plugins as a means of modularizing development efforts among the separate components of the emulated PlayStation 2 hardware. Other programmers later joined the team, and they were eventually able to get some PS2 games to the loading screen. The team then started working on the task of emulating the PlayStation 2's BIOS; they got it to run, although it was slow and graphically distorted. Version 0.9.1 was released in July 2006.

From 2007 to 2011, developers worked on Netplay and speed improvements. PCSX2 0.9.8 was released in May 2011 and featured an overhauled GUI written with wxWidgets, that improved compatibility for Linux and newer Windows operating systems. In July 2024, PCSX2 2.0 was released. It featured a new Qt GUI, support for the Vulkan API, and the removal of plugins among other changes.

The most recent stable version of PCSX2 is V2.8.2, released on August 28, 2026.

As of May 2025, 99% of PlayStation 2 games are considered "playable" or better on the emulator, meaning they can be played largely but not necessarily entirely free of issues. All at least boot to the menu screen.

PCSX2 was used as a basis for AetherSX2, a PlayStation 2 emulator for Android. In 2022, an unofficial fork of PCSX2 was created for the Xbox Series X/S known as XBSX2.

== Features ==
PCSX2 supports save states and dynamic recompilation (JIT). There is also support for gameplay recording in Full HD. Options such as the ability to increase/decrease game speeds, use unlimited memory cards, and utilize any gamepad controllers supported by the native operating system are also available. Cheat codes are supported via the use of PNACH patching files. RetroAchievements support adds a community-driven achievement system for select games.

== Hardware requirements ==
System requirements
Requirement	Minimum	Recommended
Personal Computer
Operating system	Windows 10 Version 1809 (x86-64) or higher Ubuntu 22.04 or higher, Debian, Fedora Linux, Arch Linux, or other distro (x86-64) macOS Big Sur or higher	Windows 10 Version 22H2 (x86-64) or higher Ubuntu 24.04 or higher, Debian, Fedora Linux, Arch Linux, or other distro (x86-64) macOS Big Sur or higher
CPU	i5-4790K or AMD Ryzen 5 1500x	i5-12400 or Ryzen 5 5600
Memory	8 GB RAM.	16 GB RAM.
Graphics hardware	DirectX 11, OpenGL 3.3, or Vulkan 1.1 support and 2 GB VRAM.	DirectX 12, OpenGL 4.6, Vulkan 1.3, or Metal support and 4 GB VRAM.

Hardware requirements are largely game-dependent. Due to the demanding nature of emulation, PCSX2 is much more likely to perform well with modern mid-range to high-end hardware, with lower-end systems likely to experience less than full performance. The performance bottleneck in most cases is the CPU rather than the GPU. This is especially the case in software mode, in which only the CPU is used for emulation. In hardware mode, the GPU emulates the graphics, but can still be a bottleneck if the internal resolution is set too high. Some games may also run slower due to unoptimized graphics code or weak video cards. As computer hardware has continued to advance with time, the likelihood of performance issues with PCSX2 has experienced a corresponding decrease.

== Reception ==
PCSX2 has been very well-received. Matthew Humphries of Geek.com described it as "an impressive piece of work". Alex Garnett of PC World criticized the difficulty of setting up PCSX2 but called it a "masterpiece." Although David Hayward of Micro Mart also criticized the complexity, he also called it "technically amazing." Sriram Gurunathan of In.com described PCSX2 as "arguably the most popular emulator around" and named it as one of the site's top five emulators. Brandon Widder of Digital Trends included PCSX2 in his Best Emulators article. John Corpuz of Tom's Guide mentioned PCSX2 in his Best PlayStation Emulators for PCs article, saying, "When it comes to stable, playable PlayStation 2 emulation, PCSX2 is pretty much the best game in town at the moment."

== See also ==
- RPCS3, a PlayStation 3 emulator.
- shadPS4, a PlayStation 4 emulator.
- List of video game emulators
