= 57th NHK Kōhaku Uta Gassen =

- Season 57
- Hosted by: Red Team: Yukie Nakama; White Team: Masahiro Nakai
- Winner: White Team
- Location: NHK Hall, Tokyo

Release
- Original release: December 31, 2006

The 57th NHK Kōhaku Uta Gassen (第57回NHK紅白歌合戦), referred to from hereon "Kōhaku", aired on December 31, 2006. This event was filmed and aired from NHK Hall in Japan. Air time was from 19:20 to 23:45 (with an interruption from 21:25 to 21:30 for news). All times are JST. Viewership ratings: 30.39 (1st half), 37.39 (2nd half)

This is the first edition to broadcast with 1seg.

== Broadcast stations ==
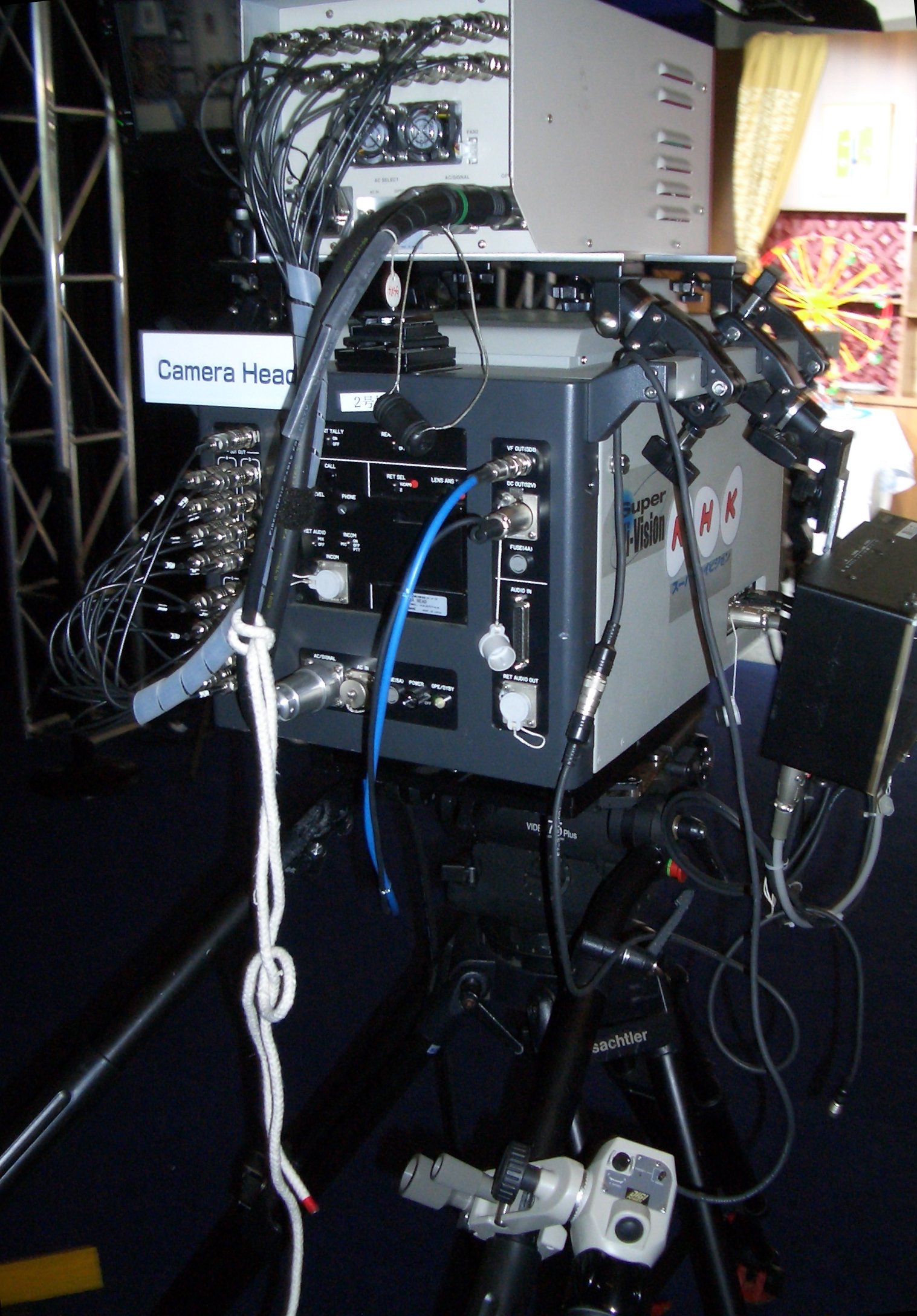
Prototype UHDTV cameras were used to capture the 57th event.

- In Japan: NHK General Television, NHK BS Hi-Vision, NHK BS-2 and NHK Radio. The 57th event marked its first Kōhaku to be broadcast on Ultra HDTV. It was also the world's first ever Ultra HDTV broadcast to be relayed over IP.
- In overseas markets: NHK World Premium and NHK Radio 1.
- Non-subscribers of NHK World Premium were able to receive the program on KTSF in San Francisco, KSCI in Southern California, and KIKU in Honolulu.

== Events leading up to broadcast date ==
September 20: Theme of the 57th event announced. "Ai. Kazoku. ~Sedai wo Koeru Uta ga Aru~", literally meaning "Love and Family: Songs that Last for Generations".

November 17: Yukie Nakama will be hostess of the Red Team. Previously, Monta Mino was supposed to be an emcee of the event, but was not offered the position in the 57th event due to a conflict of being both singer and emcee (Monta released a CD earlier in 2006.)

November 29: List of singers and groups announced, as well as the remainder of the program's team hosts and mediators. Participants include (note that the songs listed are as of the announcement. Song selections may change leading up to the event):

- Ayaka (debut): Will be singing the theme song Mikazuki, from the NHK show Tsunagaru Television @ Human.
- Shikao Suga (debut): Will be singing the song Progress, the theme music from the NHK show Professional Shigoto no Ryūgi, along with the musical group Kōkua.
- Miki Imai (debut): Along with husband/guitarist Tomoyasu Hotei.
- Hideaki Tokunaga (debut): Jazz singer. Contracted Moya Moya Disease, a cerebral vascular disorder.
- Masako Mori (15): First Kōhaku appearance in five years (52nd edition was her last). She'll also be appearing in the same program with her ex-husband Shinichi Mori, whom she divorced earlier in 2006.
- GAM (debut): A Hello! Project duo consisting of Aya Matsuura and Miki Fujimoto. Aya's appearance in this edition does not count towards her personal number of appearances, which stand at 5.
- SEAMO (debut): Released two CDs in 2006 - Lupin the Fire and Mata Aimashō.

Singers/groups who received invitations to the 57th event but declined include:

- Mai Kuraki
- Takurō Yoshida
- Yōsui Inoue
- KAT-TUN
- Yakkun Sakurazuka

December 27: Order of the performances and song assignments are announced.

=== Restriction of viewing audience participation ===
Audience participants at NHK Hall were restricted to those whose subscription fees with Hōsō Hō (Japan's Broadcasting Act) were in good standing. Whether or not this restriction was placed on previous events is unknown. NHK used this criterion as an indicator, to see if the scandals at NHK had an effect on whether or not people were paying the fee. Based on NHK statistics, 365,970 applications for tickets to the NHK Hall event were received, down from 503,721 in 2005.

== Notes leading up to event ==
- During last rehearsal earlier in the day, a 56-year-old NHK employee lost consciousness and fell on the stage. He eventually died of subarachnoid bleeding at the hospital the following day.
- Orange Range (2) is scheduled to sing the song Champione from LIVE HOUSE in Ginowan, Okinawa.
- Angela Aki (debut) will sing her hit song Home, playing solo on a piano. The last piano solo by a singer or group on Kōhaku was Kiroro when Chiharu Tamashiro sang Best Friend in 2001.
- Aika Mitsui, the newest member of Morning Musume will not participate in the group's appearance despite becoming a member on December 10.
- Saburō Kitajima (43) celebrates his 45th anniversary in entertainment by making his 43rd appearance on Kōhaku.
- Masaaki Hirao was chosen the 3rd conductor of the ending theme Hotaru no Hikari (Japan's version of Auld Lang Syne, replacing Hiroshi Miyagawa who died earlier in 2006. Hirao conducted "Hotaru no Hikari" until the 67th edition (2016), prior his death in July 2017.

== Chairpersons ==
- Red team host: Yukie Nakama
- White team host: Masahiro Nakai
- Mediators: Tamio Miyake and Megumi Kurosaki
- Radio announcers: Sen Odagiri and Yuriko Shimazu

== Performance listing ==
Red Team		White Team	
Singer	Song	Singer	Song
First-half
mihimaru GT (debut)	"Kibun Jojo"	w-inds. (5)	"Boogie Woogie 66"
BoA (5)	"Nana Iro no Ashita ～brand new beat～"	Ichirō Toba (19)	"Kyodaifune"
Yōko Nagayama (13)	"Kizuna" (along with Tokinori Kageyama)	SEAMO (debut)	"Mata Ai Macho Kōhaku"
Fuyumi Sakamoto (18)	"Iwai Zake"	Takeshi Kitayama (2)	"Otoko no Ken"
GAM (debut) & Morning Musume (9)	"Thanks!, Aruteru, 2006 Ambitious Version"	Aqua Timez (debut)	"Ketsui no Asa ni"
Ayako Fuji (15)	"Yuki Shinshin"	Takashi Hosokawa (32)	"Naniwabushi dayo Jinsei wa"
Minna no Uta 45 Years! Kids Show
攻守交代（白先攻）
Natsuko Godai (13)	"Kinmokusei"	Shikao Suga (debut)	"Progress" (along with Kōkua)
Ayaka Hirahara (3)	"Chikai"	Takao Horiuchi (17)	"Itoshii Hibi"
Ai Otsuka (3)	"Ren'ai Shashin"	Kenichi Mikawa (23)	"Sasori za no Onna 2006"
攻守交代（紅先攻）
Kaori Kōzai (14)	"Saihoku Kōro"	Orange Range (2)	"Champione"
Rimi Natsukawa (5)	"Hana"	Akira Fuse (22)	"Imagine"
Masako Mori (15)	"Bara Iro no Mirai"	Kiyoshi Maekawa (16)	"Nagasaki wa Kyo mo Ame datta"
BONNIE PINK (debut)	"A Perfect Sky"	Gospellers (6)	"Furusato"
Sayuri Ishikawa (29)	"Meoto Zenzai"	Shinichi Mori (39)	"Ofukuro-san"
2nd-half
Ayaka (debut)	"Mikazuki"	WaT (2)	"5 Centi."
Ayumi Hamasaki (8)	"Jewel"	Sukima Switch (2)	"Boku Note"
Mika Nakashima (5)	"Hitoiro"	TOKIO (13)	"Sorafune"
2006 Super Review
aiko (5)	"Hitomi"	Porno Graffitti (5)	"Haneuma Rider"
Sachiko Kobayashi (28)	"Ōedo Kenka Bana"	DJ Ozma (debut)	"Age Age Every Knight"
Angela Aki (debut)	"Home"	Masashi Sada (18)	"Kakashi"
Kaori Mizumori (4)	"Kumanokodō"	Kiyoshi Hikawa (7)	"Ikken"
Miki Imai (debut)	"PRIDE"	Hideaki Tokunaga (debut)	"Kowareru no Radio"
Akiko Wada (30)	"Mother"	Masafumi Akikawa (debut)	"Sen no Kaze ni Natte"
Yoshimi Tendo (11)	"Inochi no Kagiri"	Kobukuro (2)	"Kaze"
Kumi Koda (2)	"Yume no Uta"	Hiroshi Itsuki (36)	"Takasebune"
Dreams Come True (11)	"Nandodemo Love Love Love 2006"	SMAP (14)	"Arigatō"
Miyuki Kawanaka (19)	"Futari Sake"	Saburō Kitajima (43)	"Matsuri"

== Guests ==
=== Judges ===
- Yoko Aki, songwriter. Her husband, Ryudo Uzaki sat behind Yoko. He made a comment that he was impressed with Ichirō Toba's song.
- Masaaki Uchino, actor. He will be playing the main character in the NHK Taiga drama Fūrin Kazan.
- Minoru Kamata, physician. NHK Radio personality.
- Jakuchō Setouchi, writer and Buddhist nun. Recipient of the Order of Culture (Bunka Kunshō (文化勲章))
- Sō Taguchi, baseball player. Plays outfielder for the St. Louis Cardinals, who won the Major League Baseball World Series in the United States earlier in 2006.
- Naomi Fujiyama, actress. Plays the heroine role in the NHK morning drama Imo Tako Nankin.
- Sakura Yokomine, LPGA of Japan Tour golf professional. Sakura's father, Yoshirō Yokomine was among the audience. He also appeared on-stage in the 2006 Super Review event.
- Miyako Yoshida, ballerina. Miyako plays an active part in the British Royal Ballet.
- Lily Franky, illustrator. The autobiography Tokyo Tower is based on Lily's family.
- Ken Watanabe, actor. Ken stars in the American movie Letters from Iwo Jima and Japanese movie Ashita no Kioku.

=== Special guest ===
- Shizuka Arakawa, figure skater. Winner of the gold medal at the 2006 Winter Olympics.

=== Performing guests ===
- Hiromitsu Agatsuma, Tsugaru-jamisen player. Played alongside Ayako Fuji.
- Jake Shimabukuro, Ukulele player. Played alongside Rimi Natsukawa.
- Shima Ken, pianist. Played alongside Gospellers.
- Tomoyasu Hotei, guitarist. Played alongside Miki Imai.

== Results ==
=== Using the ball system ===
With the 57th event, the judging by balls was revived (balls were not used in the 56th event). One ball represents one point. No one knows how many points each team earned until the very end of the event. To announce the winner, balls are used as visual props. Two buckets are used to hold the balls, one colored red and the other colored white. At the end of the event, the number of balls in each bucket will equal the total number of points for each team.

First, each of the two balls representing the first-half voting are placed in the bucket of the winning teams. The buckets are then placed in a box with a hole on top - large enough for an arm to reach in.

Next, the ten judges are each handed a ball. They then leave their seats and walk up to the box. Each judge places his/her ball secretly into either the white or red bucket, indicating the team they prefer, and without anyone else seeing. Once the ten balls have been placed in the buckets, the buckets are taken out of the box and then handed to two women. The two women then walk up on stage with the buckets. A third woman follows the buckets while holding a basket containing six additional balls - representing the remaining points to be earned.

Next, everyone witnesses the total number of votes for all the 2nd-half categories (see the distribution table below). The woman with the basket of balls then place the balls into each of the two buckets, based on the points earned by the 2nd-half voting.

From here, the baskets are given to the team hosts. And then while counting up in ascending order, the team hosts throw each ball into the audience at the same time. Once a team host runs out of balls, everyone knows who the winning team is - as the winning team host continues to throw balls.

=== Winner and distribution ===
The 57th event was won by the White Team with a total of 13 points. This win breaks the tie of wins overall between the Red and White teams, as the White Team now leads with 29 victories (Red Team has 28). The table below documents the voting and points distribution:

Method	Points	Red Team	White Team
Voting at mid-way of event
Number of votes via 1seg & digital TV poll	1	8,188 votes	7,430 votes
Number of votes via cellular phone	1	4,446 votes	6,196 votes
Voting at end of event
Number of votes by NHK Hall audience	2	1,178 votes	1,437 votes
Number of votes via cellular phone	2	3,768 votes	8,528 votes
Number of votes via 1seg & digital TV poll	2	23,440 votes	27,677 votes
Judges vote (1 point for each vote)	10	4 points	6 points
Results	18	5 points	13 points

== DJ Ozma performance controversy ==
Days prior to the 57th event, DJ Ozma told the media his performance on Kōhaku would be something special. He performed his hit song, "Age Age Every Knight" live at approximately 22:22 JST. After the performance, NHK received 252 complaints within about one hour, prompting Tamio Miyake to read an official bulletin later at 23:45 JST, explaining what happened during the performance. The bulletin sent giggles throughout NHK Hall.

During DJ Ozma's performance, several of the women performers removed pieces of clothing, revealing what appeared to be naked breasts. In the NHK bulletin, Tamio explained that the women were actually wearing flesh-colored bodysuits with drawn-on breasts, and assured the audience that no nudity occurred. Further inspection via recordings show flaws in the bodysuits, such as wrinkling of the skin and the breasts on all the women looking identical.

Despite the stunt being completely fake, viewers considered the performance to be distasteful and inappropriate for children. The performance was shown after family time, however it is tradition that the Kōhaku is a family event - as children would stay up with their families and watch Kōhaku while celebrating New Year's Eve. NHK is also a Japanese government-run TV network, and viewers hold the network to a high level of quality in their programming.

Before the performance on December 31, DJ Ozma announced he would be on the TBS show CDTV Special, putting on the same performance he would be performing on Kōhaku. It is unknown whether or not TBS received complaints about the up-coming performance.

January 1: NHK posted on their web site the following message:

ＤＪ OＺＭＡのバックダンサーが裸と見間違いかねないボディスーツを 着用して出演した件について、ＮＨＫではこのような姿になるということは放送まで知りませんでした。 衣装の最終チェックであるリハーサルでは放送のような衣装ではありませんでした。今回の紅白のテーマにふさわしくないパフォーマンスだったと考えます。 視聴者の皆さまに不快な思いをおかけして誠に申し訳ないと考えております。

To loosely translate, NHK mentions that the background dancers were wearing bodysuits and therefore were not naked. The network did not know such an act would happen in the NHK broadcast. During rehearsal, the dancers were not wearing clothes like they did in the live performance. The performance did not meet the program's theme. We are sorry for the unpleasant events presented to you, our viewers.

Contrary to NHK's explanation, sports newspapers reported on December 30 - one day before the event - to expect the performance to be done in a bodysuit.

750 complaints were called in leading up to January 1 23:00 JST. On January 4, NHK president Genichi Hashimoto formally apologized about the event on-air.

January 10: Hashimoto Genichi appeared in an interview regarding the DJ Ozma event:

- The number of complaints increased to 1,796.
- NHK will implement a written agreement between the TV network and the performers so that future performances are done within broadcast ethics.

January 14: DJ Ozma expresses his apologies. But at the same time, he pointed out that NHK was evading responsibility, and mentioned the Kōhaku's producer by name.

On tape-delayed broadcasts via NHK World Premium, the video portion of DJ Ozma's performance was replaced with coastal scenery. On United States-based TV stations, the entire performance of DJ Ozma was completely removed. Viewers suspect this is in response to Janet Jackson's infamous wardrobe malfunction incident in 2004. Interesting enough, Tamio Miyake's bulletin later in the event was left in, causing viewers to wonder exactly what they missed. This caused Internet savvy users scurrying to on-line video sites such as YouTube to view the censored segment.

== Competition ==
NHK

- 19:20 - 21:25 57th NHK Kōhaku Uta Gassen (1st-half) - 30.3
- 21:30 - 23:45 57th NHK Kōhaku Uta Gassen (2nd-half) - 37.3

NTV

- 18:00 - 21:00 Omisoka Gentei! Izumi Pinko Weekender (rating not published)
- 21:00 - 24:15 Downtown no Gaki no Tsukai Yaarahende - 10.2

TBS

- 18:00 - 23:34 K-1 PREMIUM Dynamite! - 16.3 (1) / 19.9 (2) / 10.1 (3)

Fuji TV

- 19:00 - 21:00 Hosoki Kazuko no Nippon no Omisoka - 10.3
- 21:00 - 23:00 ALL JAPAN Medalist on Ice 2006 - 9.9
- 23:00 - 23:45 Saikyoun Geinojin Ketteisen 2006 - 9.9

TV Asahi

- 18:00 - 19:54 Doraemon SP - (rating not published)
- 20:00 - 23:00 Beat Takeshi's TV Tackle - 5.3
- 23:00 - 25:30 (no rating)

TV Tokyo

- 17:00 - 21:30 39th Annual Toshiwasure Nippon no Uta - 9.3
- 21:30 - 23:30 Gaia New Year's Eve SP (rating not published)
- 23:30 - 24:45 Tokyu JIRUBESUTA Concert (rating not published)

All viewership ratings are from Video Research, Ltd., and they represent only the Kantō region.

== See also ==
- Kōhaku Uta Gassen

Preceded by 56th NHK Kōhaku Uta Gassen	Kōhaku Uta Gassen	Succeeded by 58th NHK Kōhaku Uta Gassen
