= 59th NHK Kōhaku Uta Gassen =

- Season 59
- Location: NHK Hall, Tokyo

Release
- Original release: December 31, 2008

Season chronology
- ← Previous; 59th NHK Kōhaku Uta Gassen Next → 59th NHK Kōhaku Uta Gassen

The 59th NHK Kōhaku Uta Gassen (第59回NHK紅白歌合戦), referred as "Kōhaku", was aired on December 31, 2008 from NHK Hall in Japan.

The music show on New Year's Eve is broadcast on both television and radio, and divides the most popular music artists of the year into competing teams of red and white.

== Hosts ==
- Red team host: Yukie Nakama
- White team host: Masahiro Nakai
- Mediators: Kazuya Matsumoto and Fumie Ono
- Radio broadcasting spot person: Yasuhirio Yamada and Aika Kanda

== Performers ==
The singers, announced on November 25, 2008, are ordered below according to the gojūon.

| Red Team | | White Team | |
| Singer | Song | Singer | Song |
|---|---|---|---|
| aiko (7) | KissHug | Masafumi Akikawa (3) | Sen no Kaze ni Natte |
| Thelma Aoyama (debut) | Soba ni Iru ne | Aqua Timez (2) | Niji |
| Junko Akimoto (debut) | Ai no Mama de... | Hiroshi Itsuki (38) | Itezuru |
| Ayaka (3) | Okaeri | Exile (4) | Ti Amo |
| Angela Aki (3) | Tegami ~Haikei Jūgo no Kimi e~ | Saburō Kitajima (45) | Kita no Ryōba |
| Ikimono-gakari (debut) | Sakura | Takeshi Kitayama (4) | Kibō no Uta |
| Sayuri Ishikawa (31) | Amagigoe | Kimaguren (debut) | Life |
| Ai Otsuka (5) | Ai | Yūsaku Kiyama (debut) | Home |
| Miyuki Kawanaka (21) | Nirinsō | Kobukuro (4) | Toki no Ashioto |
| Girl Next Door (debut) | Guzen no Kakuritsu | Jero (debut) | Umiyuki |
| Kumi Koda (4) | Taboo | Shuchishin with Pabo (debut) | Shuchishin Kōhaku Special |
| Natsuko Godai (15) | Kyōto Ninenzaka | SMAP (16) | Kono toki, kitto yume ja nai (Kōhaku Special) |
| Sachiko Kobayashi (30) | Roran | Tōhōshinki (debut) | Purple Line~Dōshite Kimi o Suki ni Natte Shimattandarō? |
| Fuyumi Sakamoto (20) | Kaze ni Tatsu | Tokio (15) | Amagasa |
| Speed (4) | White Love (Re Track) | Hideaki Tokunaga (3) | Rainy Blue |
| Yoshimi Tendo (13) | Tonbori Ninjō | Kiyoshi Hikawa (9) | Kiyoshi no Zundoko Bushi |
| Mika Nakashima (7) | Orion | Ken Hirai (9) | Itsuka Hanareru Hi ga Kite mo |
| Mitsuko Nakamura (13) | Kawachi Otoko bushi | Akira Fuse (24) | Kimi wa Bara Yori Utsukushii |
| Ayumi Hamasaki (10) | Mirrorcle World | Porno Graffitti (7) | Gift |
| Perfume (debut) | Polyrhythm | Kiyoshi Maekawa (18) | Tokyo Sabaku |
| Yo Hitoto (5) | Hajimete | Kenichi Mikawa (25) | Sasoriza no Onna 2008 |
| Ayaka Hirahara (5) | Nocturne | Mr. Children (debut) | Gift |
| Ayako Fuji (16) | Akai Ito | Yutaka Mizutani (debut) | California Connection |
| Fujioka Fujimaki and Nozomi Ōhashi (debut) | Gake no Ue no Ponyo | Shinichi Mori (41) | Ofukurosan |
| Kaori Mizumori (6) | Wajima Asaichi | Naotarō Moriyama (3) | Ikiteru Koto ga Tsurai nara |
| Akiko Wada (32) | Yume | WaT (4) | 36 °C |

== Results ==
The winners were the shirogumi (the white team), making it their 4th consecutive win. The white team now leads with 31 wins over the red team with 28 wins. The table below documents the voting and points distribution:

| Method | Red Team | White Team | Total |
|---|---|---|---|
| Number of votes by NHK Hall audience (including judges) | 594 votes | 1,853 votes | 2,447 votes |
| Number of votes via cellular phone | 22,330 votes | 53,951 votes | 76,281 votes |
| Number of votes via 1seg | 22,763 votes | 38,957 votes | 61,700 votes |
| Number of votes via digital TV poll | 66,313 votes | 110,789 votes | 177,102 votes |
| Results | 112,000 votes | 205,530 votes | 317,530 votes |

== See also ==
- Kōhaku Uta Gassen
- 50th Japan Record Awards

| Preceded by 58th NHK Kōhaku Uta Gassen | Kōhaku Uta Gassen | Succeeded by 60th NHK Kōhaku Uta Gassen |
