= 67th NHK Kōhaku Uta Gassen =

- Also known as: 67th Kouhaku Utagassen: Sing The Dream
- Created by: Tsumoru Kondo
- Presented by: Shinichi Takeda
- Starring: Masaki Aiba (Arashi); Kasumi Arimura
- Theme music composer: Shiro Sagisu
- Opening theme: "Fly Into The Sun"
- Ending theme: "Hotaru no Hikari"
- Composer: Nobuo Kurita

Production
- Executive producer: Yukinori Kida
- Producers: from AKB48 SHOW; Tomoko Matsuda; Masashi Nishi
- Production locations: NHK Hall; Tokyo, Japan
- Running time: 1st Half: 1h40min 2nd Half: 2h45min
- Production company: NHK

Original release
- Network: NHK-G; NHK World Premium; TV Japan (US)
- Release: December 31, 2016

The 67th NHK Kōhaku Uta Gassen (第67回NHK紅白歌合戦) was the 67th edition of NHK's Kōhaku Uta Gassen, held on December 31, 2016, live from NHK Hall from 19:15 (JST) to 23:45 (JST), with a 5-minute break for the latest news. This is the 28th Heisei Era edition. The broadcast schedule was announced on September 8. The Red Team won this event.

The next year's theme was: 夢を歌おう ("Yume o Utaō", "Let's Sing a Dream"). For the last time, Masaaki Hirao conducted "Hotaru no Hikari", seven months before his death on July 21, 2017.

== Broadcast ==
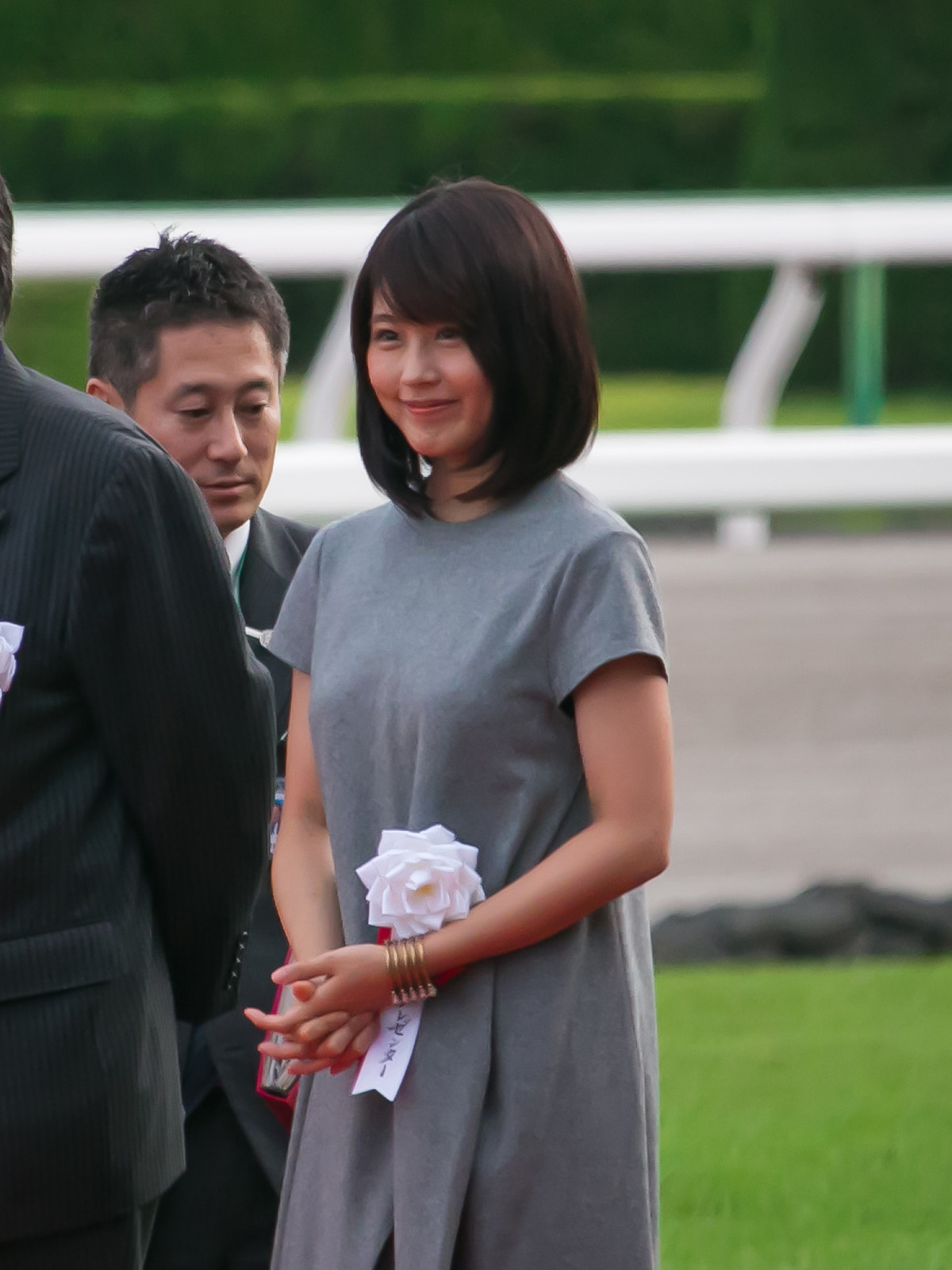
Red Team Leader: Kasumi Arimura

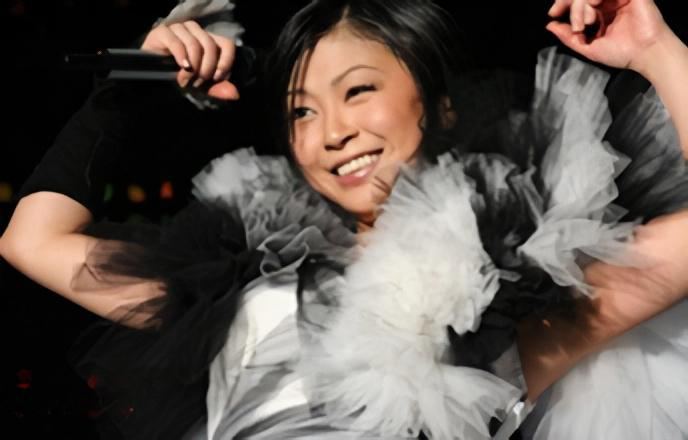
Hikaru Utada, first time on Kouhaku

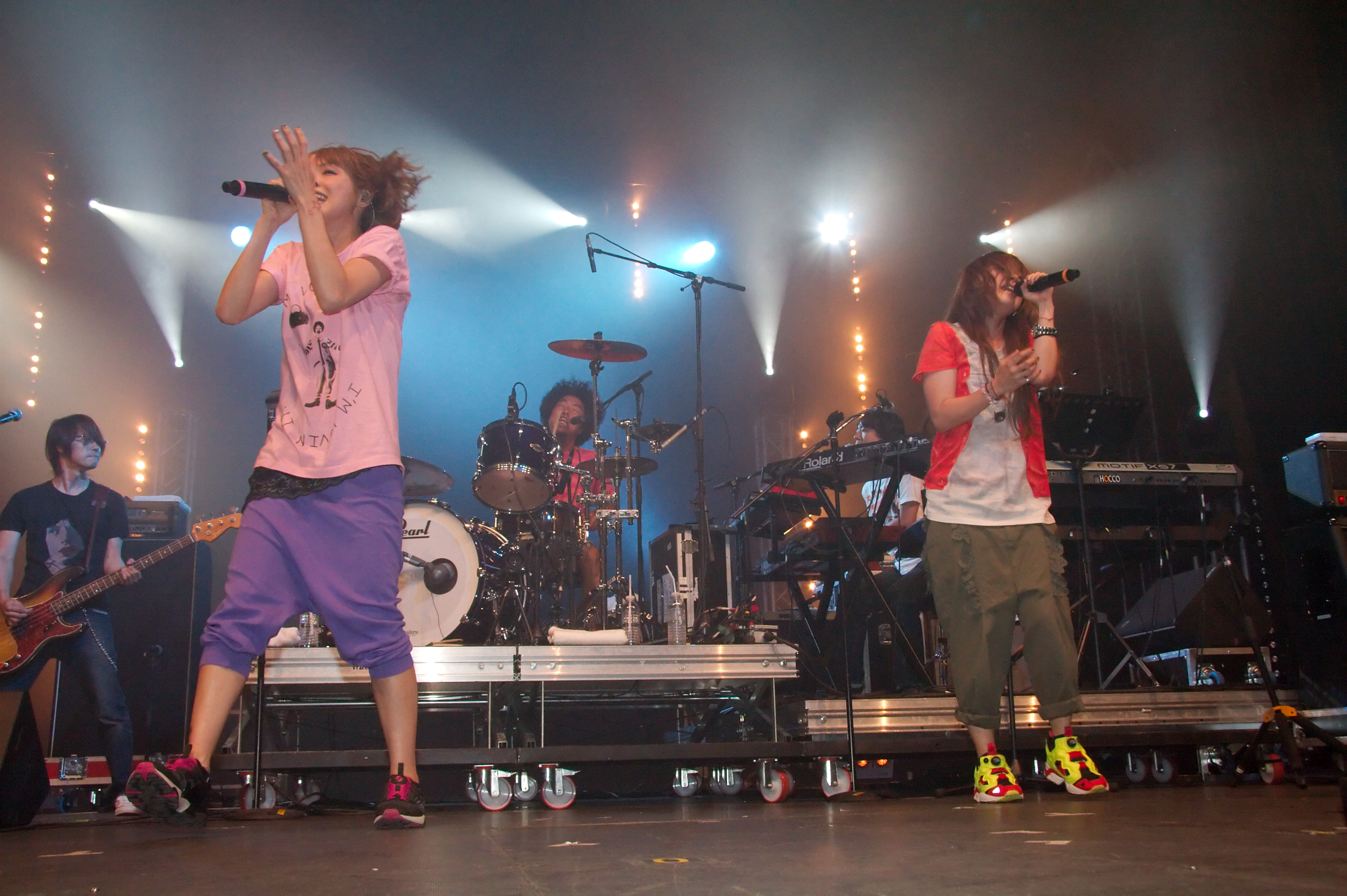
Puffy AmiYumi, will debut on this program

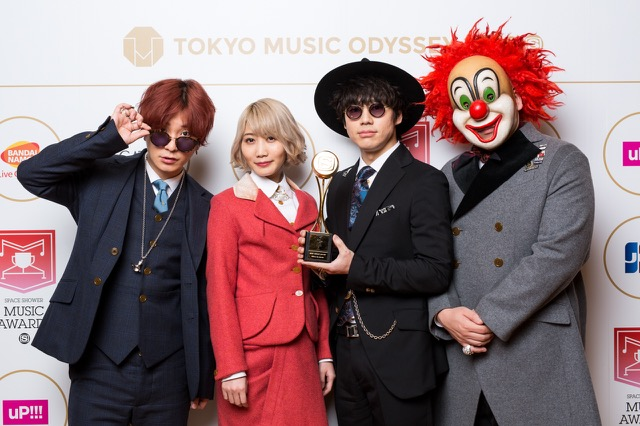
Sekai no Owari performs for third time

NHK revealed on September 8 that the 67th Kouhaku will air on December 31 (Saturday), starting from 19:15 JST and ending at 23:45 JST, with a 5-minute break for the latest news. In Japan, the broadcast takes place through NHK-G and Radio 1, and worldwide by NHK World Premium. In the United States, the show is broadcast through TV Japan, starting around 15:10 (Eastern Time). Viewers outside Japan can watch Kouhaku on NHK World Premium, starting at 10:15 UTC, the same time as the NHK-G broadcast.

This year's theme is "Let's Sing a Dream" (夢を歌おう). It was revealed that the theme will remain unchanged through the 70th edition in 2019, in support of the upcoming 2020 Summer Olympics and 2020 Summer Paralympics. On November 12, Kasumi Arimura and Aiba Masaki were announced as the captains of the Red and White teams, respectively. On November 24, the list of program artists were announced, as well as this year's mediator, Shinichi Takeda.

A special showcase from this year's Taiga Drama Sanada Maru is also being planned. On November 25, 2016, SPORTS NIPPON made a prediction of who will be the "Ootori" this year. Seiko Matsuda and Fuyumi Sakamoto are strong candidates for Akagumi, while Arashi is most likely to hold Ootori for Shirogumi. Ultimately, Arashi was chosen as Ootori.

On December 7, Tamori and Matsuko Deluxe were announced to appear as special guests. The song list was revealed on December 19. On December 21, the judges were revealed. On December 22, it was announced that "Fly into the Sun" composed by Shiro Sagisu would be used as the opening theme song. The song was written specially for the program. On December 23, SMAP officially declined their invitation to appear on Kouhaku. The performance order was announced on Christmas Day. Rehearsals started on December 28.

On December 31, the festival was broadcast live. The ball system was used for the first time in three years, and the winning team was Red team (9 balls against 6 White team). After Yoshimi Tendo's performance, viewer votes showed that Red team was in the lead with 444,495 vs 374,460 votes White. However, by half-time, White team had gained a significant lead with 1,435,175 vs 922,066 votes for Red. Final results showed that White team had won the viewer vote (4,203,679 White vs 2,527,724 Red) and venue vote (1,274 White vs 870 Red), garnering 4 balls. However, Red team won 9 guest judge votes vs 2 for White, bringing the final balls to 9 Red vs 6 White, culminating in Red team's victory. Red team captain Kasumi Arimura received the championship flag from the hands of guest judge Masao Kusakari.

With the 2016 victory, Red Team has accumulated 31 wins, while White Team continues with 36 victories.

== Personnel ==
=== Main host and team leaders ===
- Red Team Captain: Kasumi Arimura
- White Team Captain: Masaki Aiba (Arashi)
- Mediator: Shinichi Takeda

=== Live comments ===
- Announcer NHK Radio 1: Naoki Ninomiya, Aiko Terakado
- PR, Commentary: Bananaman, Naoko Hashimoto

=== Judges ===
- Osamu Akimoto (manga artist), creator of Kochikame
- Yui Aragaki (actress), starred in Nigehaji
- Kaori Icho (freestyle wrestler), gold medal in 2016 Olympics
- Shohei Ohtani (baseball player)
- Masao Kusakari (actor), played Sanada Masayuki in Taiga Sanada Maru
- Shota Shunputei (comedian)
- Mitsuki Takahata (actress), starred in Asadora Toto Neechan
- Sae Tsuji (athlete), bronze medal in 2016 Paralympics
- Kosuke Hagino (swimmer), gold medal in 2016 Olympics
- Sayaka Murata (writer), won the 155th Akutagawa Prize

=== Special guests ===
- Tamori
- Matsuko Deluxe
- Paul McCartney (VTR - Special Message)
- Godzilla

=== Live music performance ===
- Oomisoka Ongakutai (Conducted by: Nobuo Kurita)

=== Contestants ===
Debuting or returning artists are in bold.

Red Team		White Team	
Singer/Group	Performance Time	Singer/Group	Performance Time
**Ai**	2	Arashi	8
Ayaka	8	Hiroshi Itsuki	46
E-girls	4	X Japan	7
Ikimonogakari	9	Kanjani8	5
Sayuri Ishikawa	39	**Kenta Kiritani**	Debut
**Yukino Ichikawa**	Debut	**Kinki Kids**	Debut
**Hikaru Utada**	Debut	Go Hiromi	29
AKB48	9	Sandaime J Soul Brothers	5
**Shinobu Otake**	Debut	**The Yellow Monkey**	Debut
**Keyakizaka46**	Debut	Sekai no Owari	3
**Kaori Kozai**	19	Sexy Zone	4
Fuyumi Sakamoto	28	Tokio	23
Ringo Sheena	4	AAA	7
Aya Shimazu	3	Kiyoshi Hikawa	17
Mariko Takahashi	4	V6	3
Yoshimi Tendo	21	**Kohei Fukuda**	3
Kana Nishino	7	Masaharu Fukuyama	9
Nogizaka46	2	Gen Hoshino	2
**Puffy**	Debut	Hiroshi Miyama	2
Perfume	9	Keisuke Yamauchi	2
Seiko Matsuda	20	**Yuzu**	7
Kaori Mizumori	14	**Radwimps**	Debut
Miwa	4	**Radio Fish**	Debut

==== Artists not attending this year ====
RED TEAM
Miki Imai, NMB48, Sakurako Ohara, Natsuko Godai, Superfly, Ayako Fuji, Misia, μ's, Rebecca, Akiko Wada
WHITE TEAM
Exile, Gesu no Kiwami Otome, Golden Bomber, Masahiko Kondō, SMAP, Hideaki Tokunaga, Bump of Chicken, Takashi Hosokawa, Akihiro Miwa, Shinichi Mori

== Performance order ==
Kanjani8 and Puffy were the first artists to perform. The final performers were Sayuri Ishikawa and Arashi, thus making this Arashi's first "Ootori". Five artist performed live from a remote location: Ringo Shiina & Tokio (from Tokyo Metropolitan Government Building), Masaharu Fukuyama (from Pacific Convention Plaza Yokohama), Hikaru Utada (from London, United Kingdom), and Kiyoshi Hikawa (from Kumamoto Castle).

Red Team				White Team			
Order	Singer/Group	Performance Time	Song	Order	Singer/Group	Performance Time	Song
First Part (19h15 - 20h55 JST)
Opening "Fly Into The Sun" (Composed by Shiro Sagisu)
2	Puffy	Debut	Puffy 20 Shūnen Kouhaku Special	1	Kanjani8	5	Zukkoke Otokomichi ~Kohaku de Yume wo Utaou~
3	AAA	7	Hurricane Riri, Boston Mari	4	E-girls	4	Dance With Me Now!
5	Keyakizaka46	Debut	Silent Majority	6	Hiroshi Miyama	2	Shimantogawa ~Kendama Taishi hen~
8	Miwa	4	Yui	7	Keisuke Yamauchi	2	Ruten no Hatoba ~Kyukyoku no Kikoshi hen~
10	Yoshimi Tendo	21	Anata no Kado	9	Sexy Zone	4	Yobisute Kouhaku '16
12	Yukino Ichikawa	Debut	Kokoro Kasanete	11	Sekai no Owari	3	Hey Ho from RPG
14	Kaori Kozai	19	Suki ~Ma Tamaru Special Ver.~	13	Sandaime J Soul Brothers	5	Welcome to TOKYO
15	Ringo Sheena	4	Seishun no Matataki -FROM NEO TOKYO 2016-	16	Kohei Fukuda	3	Tokyo Gorin Ondo
17	Ayaka	8	Mikazuki	18	Go Hiromi	29	Ienai yo
20	Kaori Mizumori	14	Echigo Mizuhara ~Hakucho Hisho~	19	V6	3	Smile! Medley
21	Ikimonogakari	9	Sakura	22	Yuzu	7	Miagete Goran Yoru no Hoshi wo ~Bokura no Uta~
Kouhaku Halftime Show (Presented by Kazunari Ninomiya)
Naomi Watanabe – Crazy in Love				Pico Taro – PPAP (Pen-Pineapple-Apple-Pen)			
Last Part (21h00 - 23h45 JST)
23	RADWIMPS	Debut	Zen Zen Zense [original ver.]	24	Nogizaka46	2	Sayonara no Imi
26	Aya Shimazu	3	Kawa no Nagare no Yō ni	25	Masaharu Fukuyama	9	2016 Special Medley
28	Kana Nishino	7	Dear Bride	27	Radio Fish	Debut	Perfect Human
30	Ai	2	Minna ga Minna Eiyū	29	Kenta Kiritani	Debut	Umi no Koe ~Minna no Umi no Koe Version~
31	AKB48	9	Yume no Kouhaku Senbatsu Special Medley	32	Hiroshi Itsuki	46	Kuzuruyagawa
Kasumi Arimura Presents Special Project – "Furusato"
34	Perfume	9	Flash	33	Kinki Kids	Debut	Glass no Shonen
36	Shinobu Otake	Debut	Ai no Sanka	35	Gen Hoshino	2	Koi
37	Fuyumi Sakamoto	28	Yozakura Oshichi	38	TOKIO	23	Sorafune
39	Seiko Matsuda	20	Bara no Yoni Saite Sakura no Yoni Chitte	40	X Japan	7	Kurenai
41	Mariko Takahashi	4	Gomen ne...	42	The Yellow Monkey	Debut	Jam
44	Hikaru Utada	Debut	Hanataba o Kimi ni	43	Kiyoshi Hikawa	17	Shirakumo no Shiro
45	Sayuri Ishikawa	39	Amagigoe	46	Arashi	8	Arashi x Kouhaku Special Medley
Hotaru no Hikari (Ending Theme, conducted by Maasaki Hirao)

NOTE: Some songs are performed from remote locations or with a live band and voice. Most songs are performed live along with pre-recorded backing tracks furnished by their labels. Other backing tracks are produced & performed live by Oomisoka Ongakutai, from NHK Studio 502.

=== Songs performed on medleys ===
- Puffy: "Asia no Junshin", "Nagisa ni Matsuwaru Et Cetera"
- Sekai no Owari: "RPG", "Hey Ho"
- V6: "Wa ni Natte Odorou", "Honey Beat"
- Fukuyama Masaharu: "Shounen", "1461 days"
- AKB48: "River", "Flying Get", "Kimi wa Melody"
- Arashi: "Arashi", "Happiness", "One Love"

== Final results and ratings ==
Final Results
	Red Team	White Team
Balls	9	6
Venue Votes (2 balls)
NHK Hall	870	1,274
Viewer Votes (2 balls)
Partials	922,066	1,435,175
Overall	2,527,724	4,203,679
Individual Votes (TV, 1-Seg & Apps)
DTV	1,365,786	1,884,081
1-Seg	26,842	47,863
App Android	1,135,096	2,271,735
Judge Votes (1 ball each)
Balls	9	2
Winner Team: Red
Ratings; Kanto: 35.1% (1st Part) & 40.2% (2nd Part); Kansai: 34.0% (1st Part) & 39.5% (2nd Part)

== Trivia ==
- This year's theme was announced in support of the 2020 Olympics and Paralympic Games, which will be held in Tokyo, with the same theme being retained through the 70th Kouhaku.
- SMAP will not be making their final appearance before their disbandment in Kōhaku Uta Gassen, as many had hoped.
- Masaki Aiba of Arashi will be captain of the White Team for the sixth time (counting the other five times, along with the other members of Arashi, between 2010 and 2014). This time, for the first time, Arashi is chosen for Ootori.
- On November 21, Takashi Hosokawa refused his invitation and announced his retirement from Kouhaku. Akiko Wada will not attend this year.
- This Kōhaku marked Ikimono-gakari's last TV performance. The group announced their hiatus on January 5, 2017.
- In 2017, it will be 10 years since the last episode of "Pop Jam" was aired. On this occasion, The Yellow Monkey performed "JAM".
- "Furusato" was performed again, since their last appearance in the 65th edition. All artists performed. This song is featured on Arashi's 2015 album Japonism.
- For the first time, all the Sakamichi Series groups performed in the same edition. In counterpart, only AKB48 (from AKB48 GROUP) was performed on NHK Hall. Haruka Shimazaki, Haruna Kojima and Nanami Hashimoto performed for the last time as members from AKB48 and Nogizaka46 respectively.
- Kiyoshi Hikawa released his first single with a theme song from an anime series. "Limit Breaking x Survivor" is the second opening theme from Dragon Ball Super starting from episode 77. It was released on August 26, 2017.
- Ringo Shiina performed alongside the former members of Tokyo Jihen in this Kōhaku. The band, however, was not officially reuniting.
- "Ai no Sanka" is a Japanese version of the song "L'hymne a l'amour", originally recorded by Edith Piaf.
- Masaaki Hirao conducted "Hotaru no Hikari" for the last time, seven months before his death on July 21, 2017. Starting from 68th edition, it will be replaced by Shunichi Tokura.
