= 60th NHK Kōhaku Uta Gassen =

- Season 60
- Hosted by: Yukie Nakama; Masahiro Nakai
- Winner: White Team
- Location: NHK Hall, Tokyo

Release
- Original release: December 31, 2009

The 60th NHK Kōhaku Uta Gassen (第60回NHK紅白歌合戦), referred to from hereon as "Kōhaku", was aired on December 31, 2009, from NHK Hall in Japan.

== Performers ==
The singers, announced on November 23, 2009, are ordered below according to the gojūon. Names in bold letters did not perform in the preceding year's program.

Red Team		White Team	
Singer	Song	Singer	Song
aiko (8)	Ano Ko no Yume	Arashi (debut)	Arashi x Kōhaku Special Medley
Junko Akimoto (2)	Ai no Mama De...	Alice (3)	Champion
Ayaka (4)	Minna Sora no Shita	Hiroshi Itsuki (39)	Itezuru
Angela Aki (4)	Tegami (Haikei Jūgo no Kimi e)	Exile (5)	Someday
Ikimono-gakari (2)	Yell	NYC Boys (debut)	60th Kōhaku Memorial NYC Special
Sayuri Ishikawa (32)	Tsugaru Kaikyō Fuyu Geshiki	Saburō Kitajima (46)	Matsuri
AKB48 (2)	River Surprise Kōhaku Remix	Takeshi Kitayama (5)	Tsurugi San
Ai Otsuka (6)	Is	Kobukuro (5)	Stay
Girl Next Door (2)	Infinity	Jero (2)	Umiyuki
Miyuki Kawanaka (22)	Futari Zake	SMAP (17)	Soto Kyutto ~ Sekai ni Hitotsu Dake no Hana
Kaela Kimura (debut)	Butterfly	Tohoshinki (2) (*Last Stage Performance As A 5-Member Group)	Stand by U
Kumi Koda (5)	2009 Kōhaku Koda Special	Tokio (16)	Taiyō to Sabaku no Bara
Natsuko Godai (16)	Shinobu Ame	Hideaki Tokunaga (4)	Kawarekake no Radio
Sachiko Kobayashi (31)	Manyō Koiuta Aa, Kimi Matsu to	Kiyoshi Hikawa (10)	Tokimeki no Rumba
Fuyumi Sakamoto (21)	Mata Kimi ni Koishiteru	Funky Monkey Babys (debut)	Hero
Yoshimi Tendō (14)	Hanaikada	Masaharu Fukuyama (2)	Hatsukoi
Dreams Come True (featuring Fuzzy Control) (13)	Sono Saki e ~Kōhaku Special Version~	Akira Fuse (25)	My Way
Mika Nakashima (8)	Nagareboshi	flumpool (debut)	Hoshi ni Negai o
Mitsuko Nakamura (14)	Kawachi Otoko Bushi	Takashi Hosokawa (33)	Bōkyō jon kara
Perfume (2)	One Room Disco	Porno Graffitti (8)	Anima Rossa
Ayumi Hamasaki (11)	Rule	Kenichi Mikawa (26)	Sasoriza no Onna 2009
Ayaka Hirahara (6)	Mio Amore	Shinichi Mori (42)	Hana to Chō
Nana Mizuki (debut)	Shin'ai	Yusuke (debut)	Himawari
Kaori Mizumori (7)	Aki no Miyajima	Yuzu (3)	Aitai
Akiko Wada (33)	Mōichido Futari de Uta Itai	Remioromen (debut)	Konayuki

== Results ==
The winners were the white team, making it their 5th consecutive win. The table below documents the voting and points distribution:

Method	Red Team	White Team	Total
Total votes	213,047 votes	348,708 votes	561,755 votes
Number of votes via cellular phone	28,428 votes	65,231 votes	93,659 votes
Number of votes via 1seg	47,320 votes	77,346 votes	124,666 votes
Number of votes via digital TV poll	136,333 votes	204,598 votes	340,931 votes
Number of votes by NHK Hall audience (including judges)	966 votes	1,533 votes	2,499 votes

== Special guests ==
From the Kodomo (children's) Kōhaku Uta Gassen:

- Seishiro Kato
- Maya Sakura
- Nozomi Ōhashi
- Snow Prince Gasshoudan (Chorus)

Additional guests:

- Susan Boyle
- Ai Sugiyama
- Mitsuko Mori
- Tatsunori Hara
- Hakuhō Shō
- Toshiyuki Nishida
- Kyoko Fukada
- Eikichi Yazawa
- Shirota Yuu

== See also ==
- Kōhaku Uta Gassen
- 51st Japan Record Awards
