= 58th NHK Kōhaku Uta Gassen =

- Season 58
- Location: NHK Hall, Tokyo

Release
- Original release: December 31, 2007

Season chronology
- ← Previous; 58th NHK Kōhaku Uta Gassen Next → 58th NHK Kōhaku Uta Gassen

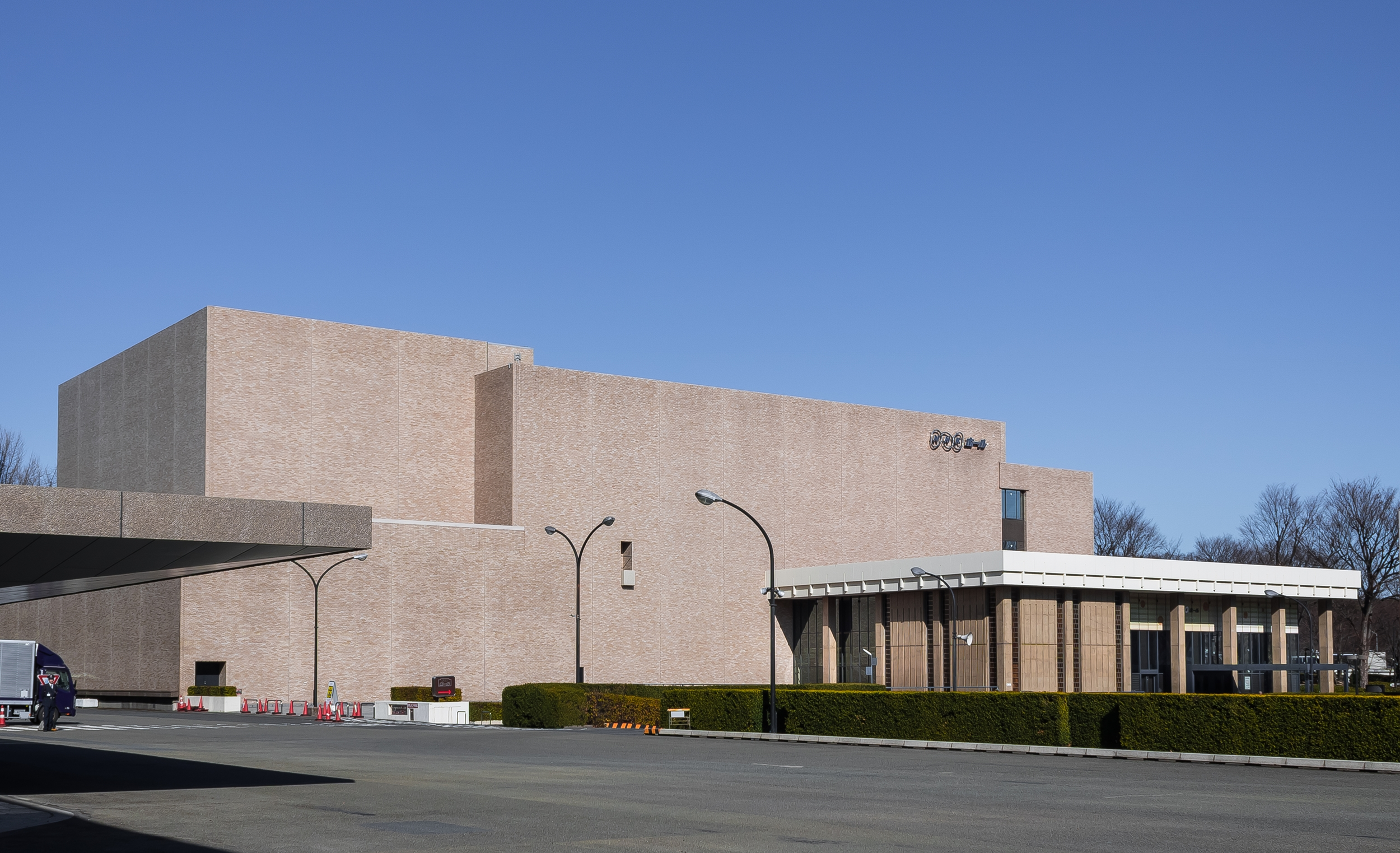
NHK hall

The 58th NHK Kōhaku Uta Gassen (第58回NHK紅白歌合戦), referred to from here on as "Kōhaku," aired on December 31, 2007, on NHK Hall in Japan.

The music show on New Year's Eve is broadcast on both television and radio, and divides the most popular music artists of the year into competing teams of red and white. Air time was from 19:20 to 23:45 (with an interruption from 21:25 to 21:30 for news). All times are JST.

== Chairpersons ==
- Red team host: Masahiro Nakai
- White team host: Tsurube Shōfukutei
- Mediators: Kazuya Matsumoto and Miki Sumiyoshi
- Radio announcers: Sen Odagiri and Ai Tsukahara

== Performance listing ==
Red Team		White Team	
Singer	Song	Singer	Song
First-half
Hello! Project 10th Kōhaku Anniversary Special Group Morning Musume (10); Berryz Kobo (debut); Cute (°C-ute) (debut)	"Special LOVE Mix ~Shiawase no Heisei 20 Shunen Ver.~"	Kenichi Mikawa (24)	"Sasoriza no Onna 2007"
Miyuki Kawanaka (20)	"Kanazawa no Ame"	Ichirō Toba (20)	"Kyoudai Bune"
Mitsuko Nakamura (12)	"Danjiri"	w-inds. (6)	"Beautiful Life"
Yōko Nagayama (14)	"Jonkara Onna Bushi"	Takeshi Kitayama (3)	"Oga Hantou"
Mihimaru GT (2)	"Gazen Yeah!"	Exile (3)	"Lovers Again ~Kōhaku Version~"
Angela Aki (2)	"Sakura Iro"	WaT (3)	"WaT Kōhaku Selection"
Kaori Kōzai (15)	"Mugon Zaka"	Akira Fuse (23)	"Kimi wa Bara yori Utsukushii"
Kaori Mizumori (5)	"Hitori Satsumaji"	Kiyoshi Maekawa (17)	"Soshite, Kobe"
Oshirikajirimushi Special Stage
AKB48 (debut); Leah Dizon (debut); Shoko Nakagawa (debut)	"Nihon ga Hokoru Saisentan! Special Medley"	Kome Kome Club (5)	"AiKimi Roman"
Ayaka (2)	"Peace Loving People ~Special Piano Version~"	Porno Graffitti (6)	"Link"
Natsuko Godai (14)	"Fune"	Sukima Switch (3)	"Kanade"
Aming (2)	"Matsuwa'07" (I Wait '07)	Masato Sugimoto (debut)	"Waremokō"
Ayaka Hirahara (4)	"Jupiter"	Akira Terao (2)	"Ruby no Yubiwa"
BoA (6)	"BoA Winter Ballad Special"	Toshihide Baba (debut)	"Start Line~Atarashii Kaze"
Fuyumi Sakamoto (19)	"Yozakura Oshichi ~Ōmisoka Special~"	Masashi Sada (19)	"Birthday"
Izumi Sakai Tsuitō Kikaku, Zard Film Concert Chūkei, ""Yureru Omoi"" ""Glorious Mind"" ""Makenaide""
Second-half
Sachiko Kobayashi (29)	"Koizakura"	Gackt (5)	"Returner ~Yami no Shūen~Kie Iku Samurai e no Requiem~"
Ai Otsuka (4)	"Chu-Lip"	Tokio (14)	"SEISYuN"
Ayumi Hamasaki (9)	"Together When..."	Noriyuki Makihara (2)	"Green Days"
aiko (6)	"Shiawase" (Happiness)	Kiyoshi Hikawa (8)	"Kiyoshi no Sōran Bushi, YOSAKOI no Sōran Kōhaku Special"
Kumi Koda (3)	"Ai no Uta"	Hideaki Tokunaga (2)	"Koi ni Ochite -Fall in Love-"
Ataru Nakamura (debut)	"Tomodachi no Uta"	Ken Hirai (5)	"Elegy"
Yoshimi Tendō (12)	"Chindo Monogatari ~Kizuna~"	Saburō Kitajima (44)	"Kaero Kana"
Mika Nakashima (6)	"Life"	Kobukuro (3)	"Tsubomi"
Yo Hitoto (4)	"Hanamizuki"	Masafumi Akikawa (2)	"Sen no Kaze ni Natte" (A Thousand Winds)
Dreams Come True (12)	"A-I-SHI-TE-RU no Sign ~Watashitachi no Mirai Yosōzu~ Kōhaku Version"	SMAP (15)	"Dangan Fighter Kōhaku SP"
Yū Aku Tsuitō Corner
Akiko Wada (31)	"Ano Kane wo Narasu no wa Anata"	Shinichi Mori (40)	"Kita no Hotaru"
Sayuri Ishikawa (30)	"Tsugaru Kaikyō-Fuyu Geshiki"	Hiroshi Itsuki (37)	"Chigiri" (Promise)

== Results ==
The winners were the shirogumi, the white team, which was revealed by illuminating the darkened Tokyo Tower in blue-white light.

Viewing percentages in the Kantō region were 32.8% for the first section and 39.5% for the second.

=== Judges ===
- Aoi Miyazaki
- Momoko Ueda
- Hideki Okajima
- Isao Aoki
- Nakamura Kanzaburō XVIII
- Yui Aragaki
- Ken Mogi
- Mariko Bando
- Tomonori Jinnai

Preceded by 57th NHK Kōhaku Uta Gassen	Kōhaku Uta Gassen	Succeeded by 59th NHK Kōhaku Uta Gassen
