= 64th NHK Kōhaku Uta Gassen =

- Created by: Tsumoru Kondo
- Presented by: Yumiko Udô
- Starring: Arashi; Haruka Ayase
- Opening theme: "64kai dayo! Kouhaku Utagassen"
- Ending theme: "Hotaru no Hikari"
- Composer: Tsunaki Mihara

Production
- Production locations: NHK Hall; Tokyo, Japan
- Running time: 265 minutes
- Production company: NHK

Original release
- Network: NHK-G; NHK World Premium
- Release: December 31, 2013

The 64th NHK Red & White Year-End Song Festival (第64回NHK紅白歌合戦) was aired on December 31, 2013. This edition's theme was "歌がここにある" ("Uta ga Koko ni Aru", "The Song Is Here") and the captains were Arashi (Shirogumi) and Haruka Ayase (Akagumi). This was the 25th edition on Heisei Era. The most notable highlights from this edition were the Amachan special segment, Yuko Oshima's surprise graduation announcement during AKB48 performance, and final performance from Saburo Kitajima who announced an honorable retirement from Kouhaku after 50 performances.

For the second time since 2012 The White Team won the event, this time using a ball system. The final score was 4-9 (Shirogumi wins).

== About the show ==
Once again, NHK gave priority to Japanese artists, including rookie Chris Hart, who sang on stage with Seiko Matsuda. Other musical collaboration was between Nana Mizuki and T.M.Revolution. Other artists who debuted in Kouhaku are: Sexy Zone, NMB48, Shigeru Izumiya, Linked Horizon, Sakanaction, E-Girls and Miwa. Golden Bomber sang again "Memeshikute", who performed in 2012, but this time inspired by Olympic sports, due to the Tokyo city of choice to host the Olympic Games in 2020. Several artists presented "medleys", as in the case of AKB48, Masaharu Fukuyama, E-Girls, Exile, Momoiro Clover Z, Arashi and Seiko Matsuda. The traditional "Ootori" was made by veteran Saburo Kitajima, who declared that he would be participating for the 50th and last time the Kouhaku (the singer is 77 years old) and it is fair to sing "Matsuri" for being the last singer to perform before the announcement the winning team.

As tradition dictates, at the end of the event, all the artists sing "Hotaru no Hikari" with the regency of Masaaki Hirao. The ball system was used for the first time in seven years, and the winning team was the Shirogumi (9 votes against 4 Akagumi), accumulating 35 wins. Akagumi continues with 29 wins and have not won since 2011.

The average program audience (in the Kanto region) was approximately 44.5% being the highest since 2004. The program had audience peak of 51% during the final presentation of Saburo Kitajima. Other moments were the most watched Yuko Oshima graduation announcement during the presentation of AKB48 and participation of the cast of Ama-chan, one of the greatest successes of the Japanese TV in 2013

== Performance order ==
This was the final time which Ayumi Hamasaki was the opening act for the Kouhaku.

Debuting or returning artists are in bold.

Red Team				White Team			
Order	Singer/Group	Appearances	Song	Order	Singer/Group	Appearances	Song
First Part
1	Ayumi Hamasaki	15	Inspire	2	**Sexy Zone**	Debut	Sexy Heiwa Zone Kumikyoku (Note: Sexy Zone: "Sexy Zone", "Lady Diamond", "Sexy Summer ni Yuki ga Furu", "Real Sexy", and "Bye Bye Dubai (See You Again)".)
3	**NMB48**	Debut	"Kamonegikkusu"	4	Takashi Hosokawa	37	"Naniwabushi dayo Jinsei wa" 2013
6	Kaori Kozai	17	"Sake no Yado"	5	Hideaki Tokunaga	3	"Yume o Shinjite"
8	**E-girls**	Debut	E-Girls Kōhaku Special Medley 2013 (Note: E-Girls: "Follow Me" and "Gomennasai no Kissing You")	7	Hiromi Go	26	"Bang Bang"
10	Natsuko Godai	20	"Kinmokusei"	9	Sandaime J Soul Brothers	2	"Fuyu Monogatari"
11	AAA	4	"Koi Oto to Amazora"	12	**Kohei Fukuda**	Debut	"Nanbu Semishigure"
13	Ayako Fuji	19	"Akai Ito"	14	**Sakanaction**	Debut	"Music"
15	**Miwa**	Debut	"Hikari e"	16	Porno Graffitti	12	"Seishun Hanamichi"
17	Yoshimi Tendo	18	"Furusato Ginga"	18	**Linked Horizon**	Debut	"Jiyū e no Shingeki" Kōhaku Special ver.
19	Kakumei 2013: Nana Mizuki (5) x **T.M.Revolution** (4) Special Collaboration (Note: Nana Mizuki x T.M Revolution: "Preserved Roses" and "Kakumei Dualism")						
20	SKE48	2	"Sansei Kawaii!"	21	Shinichi Mori	46	"Erimomisaki"
22	Fuyumi Sakamoto	25	"Otoko no Himatsuri"	23	Kobukuro	8	"Ima, Sakihokoru Hanatachi yo"
"Uta ga Koko ni Aru" Special Project: Tōhoku Earthquake Recovery Support Song "Hana wa Saku"
Second Part
25	**Momoiro Clover Z**	2	Momoiro Kōhaku 2013 da Z!! (Note: Momoiro Clover Z: "Gounn" and "Hashire!")	24	Exile	9	Exile Pride (Konna Sekai o Ai Suru Tame)
27	Aiko	12	"Loveletter	26	Golden Bomber	2	"Memeshikute"
29	Kana Nishino	4	"Sayonara"	28	Kiyoshi Hikawa	14	"Manten no Hoshi"
30	Akiko Wada	37	"Ima demo Anata"	31	Tokio	20	"Ambitious Japan"
"Uta ga Koko ni Aru" Special Project: Amachan Special Performance (Note: Amachan Special Performance: "Koyomi no Uede wa December", "Shiosai no Memory", and "Jimoto ni Kaero")
32	**Dreams Come True**	15	"Saa Kane o Narase"				
34	Kyary Pamyu Pamyu	2	Kōhaku 2012 Kyary Pamyu Pamyu Medley (Note: Kyary Pamyu Pamyu: "Ninja Re Bang Bang" and "Mottai Night Land")	33	Kanjani Eight	2	Kōhaku 2-dome! Yobarete Tobidete Je Je Je Je!! (Note: Kanjani Eight: "Hesomagari" and "T.W.L")
36	Perfume	6	"Magic of Love"	35	Hiroshi Itsuki	43	"Hakata a la Mode"
38	Kaori Mizumori	11	"Ise Meguri"	37	**Yuzu**	5	"Ame Nochi Hallelujah"
"Uta ga Koko ni Aru" Special Project: Nippon no Arashi "Furusato"
39	Sayuri Ishikawa	36	"Tsugaru Kaikyō Fuyugeshiki"	40	Akihiro Miwa	2	"Furusato no Sora no Shita ni"
41	AKB48	6	Kōhaku 2013 SP: AKB48 Festival (Note: AKB48: "Koi Suru Fortune Cookie and "Heavy Rotation")	42	Masaharu Fukuyama	6	2013 Special Medley (Note: Masaharu Fukuyama: "vs.2013 ~Chikaku to Kairaku no Rasen~", "Moment" and "Sakasama no Sora")
44	Ikimono-gakari	6	"Egao"	43	**Shigeru Izumiya**	Debut	"Shunkashūtō" 2013
46	**Seiko Matsuda** & **Chris Hart**	17/Debut	New Year's Eve Special Song Medley 2013 (Note: Seiko Matsuda & Chris Hart: "Anata ni Aitakute (Missing You)" and "Yume ga Samete")	45	Arashi	5	New Year's Eve Medley 2013 (Note: Arashi: "Endless Game" and "Breathless")
47	**Mariko Takahashi**	2	"For You..."	48	SMAP	21	Joymap!! (Note: SMAP: "Mistake" and "Joy!!")
				49	Saburō Kitajima	50	"Matsuri"
"Hotaru no Hikari" (Ending theme, conducted by Masaaki Hirao)
