= 62nd NHK Kōhaku Uta Gassen =

- Season 62
- Hosted by: Red Team: Mao Inoue; White Team: Arashi
- Winner: Red Team
- Location: NHK Hall, Tokyo

Release
- Original release: December 31, 2011

The 62nd NHK Kōhaku Uta Gassen (第62回NHK紅白歌合戦), referred to from hereon as "Kōhaku", aired on December 31, 2011, from NHK Hall in Japan beginning from 7:15 p.m. JST.

The year's theme was "Ashita o Utaou" ("Let's sing for tomorrow"), which aimed to spread positive thoughts to a country still rocked by the aftermath of the Tohoku earthquake and subsequent tsunami. The theme also sought to begin the new year with a fresh hope.

This is the first edition to broadcast in digital terrestrial televisions (except in Fukushima, Miyagi, and Iwate prefectures), after Japan had switched over on July 24, 2011.

The White Team's six-year reign as the winners of Kōhaku Uta Gassen came to end as the 62nd Kōhaku Uta Gassen was won by The Red Team.

Kohaku aired a pre-recorded performance for the first time with Lady Gaga's "Born This Way".

== Performers ==
Mao Inoue, the host of the Red Team, is a Japanese actress best known for her roles in Hana Yori Dango (Boys Over Flowers), and Kids War and co-starring with Chizuru Ikewaki in Mitsui ReHouse commercial from 1997 to 1999. Arashi, the hosts for the White Team, are a popular male J-Pop group who has not only sold millions, but appeared in dramas, hosted shows, and had countless endorsements.

Performances are in order. Number of appearances on Kōhaku are listed after each artist.

=== First half ===
- 1. Ayumi Hamasaki "progress" (13)
- 2. NYC "100% Yuuki NYC" (3)
- 3. Angela Aki "One Family" (6)
- 4. flumpool "Akashi" (3)
- 5. AKB48 "Kohaku 2011 AKB48 Special MIX ~Ganbarō Nihon!~" (4)
- Mana Ashida, Fuku Suzuki "Maru Maru Mori Mori!" (New)
- 6. Funky Monkey Babys "Soredemo Shinjiteru" (3)
- 7. Nishino Kana "Tatoe Donna ni" (2)
- 8. AAA "CALL" (2)
- 9. Miyuki Kawanaka "Nirinsō" (24)
- 10. Ken Hirai "Itoshiki Hibi yo" (7)
- 11. Ayako Fuji "Ayako no Okuni Jiman dayo ~Ganbarona Tohoku!! Kohaku Special~" (17)
- 12. Takashi Hosokawa "Nebuta" (35)
- 13. Nana Mizuki "POP MASTER" (3)
- 14. Porno Graffitti "One More Time" (10)
- 15. Inawashirokos "I love you & I need you Fukushima" (New)
- 16. Natsuko Godai "Kinmokusei" (18)
- 17. L'Arc-en-Ciel "CHASE" (5)
- 18. Kaori Mizumori "Shōnai Heiya Kaze no Naka" (9)
- 19. Shinichi Mori "Minato Machi Blues" (44)
- 20. Ringo Sheena "Carnation – Akagumi nara Dare Demo" (New)
- Rimi Natsukawa (6), Masafumi Akikawa (4) "Asu to Iu Hi ga"

=== Second half ===
- 21. KARA "KARA 2011 Special Medley" (New)
- 22. Hideaki Tokunaga "Jidai" (6)
- 23. Perfume "Laser Beam" (4)
- 24. TOKIO "Miageta Ryusei" (18)
- 25. Girls' Generation "GENIE" (New)
- 26. Hiromi Go "Go Smile Japan" (24)
- 27. aiko "Koi no Superball" (10)
- 28. Yuzu "Hey Wa" (4)
- 29. Koda Kumi "Ai wo Tomenaide" (7)
- 30. Tohoshinki "Why？(Keep Your Head Down)" (3)
- 31. Ayaka Hirahara "Ohisama ~Taisetsu na Anata e" (8)
- 32. Masao Sen "Kita Guni no Haru" (16)
- 33. Sachiko Kobayashi "Onna no Sakaba" (33)
- 34. Toshiyuki Nishida "Ano Machi ni Umarete" (4)
- 35. Ayaka "Minna Sora no Shita" (5)
- 36. Tsuyoshi Nagabuchi "Hitotsu" (3)
- 37. Akiko Wada "Ano Kane wo Narasu no wa Anata" (35)
- 38. Arashi "2011 Kohaku Special Medley" (3)
- 39. Ikimono-gakari "Aruite Ikou" (4)
- 40. Hiroshi Itsuki "Furusato" (41)
- 41. Seiko Matsuda (16), Sayaka Kanda (New) "Ue wo Muite Arukou」
- 42. Kiyoshi Hikawa "Jounetsu no Mariachi" (12)
- 43. Fuyumi Sakamoto "Yozakura Oshichi" (23)
- 44. Masaharu Fukuyama "Kazoku ni Narou yo" (4)
- 45. Yumi Matsutoya "(Minna no) Haru yo, Koi" (2)
- 46. Exile "Rising Sun" (7)
- 47. Yoshimi Tendō "Ai Sansan" (16)
- 48. Saburō Kitajima "Kaerokana" (48)
- 49. Sayuri Ishikawa "Tsugaru Kaikyo Fuyugeshiki" (34)
- 50. SMAP "SMAP AID Kohaku SP" (19)
