= 61st NHK Kōhaku Uta Gassen =

- Season 61
- Hosted by: Red Team: Matsushita Nao; White Team: Arashi
- Winner: White Team
- Location: NHK Hall, Tokyo

Release
- Original release: December 31, 2010

Season chronology
- ← Previous; 61st NHK Kōhaku Uta Gassen Next → 61st NHK Kōhaku Uta Gassen

The 61st NHK Kōhaku Uta Gassen (第61回NHK紅白歌合戦), referred to from hereon as "Kōhaku", aired on December 31, 2010, from NHK Hall in Japan.

This was the last time the Kōhaku was broadcast in analog television transmission. As of July 24, 2011 the digital television switchover throughout Japan will occur, when analog signals (both terrestrial/over-the-air and satellite) will be shut off and rendered obsolete. As such, the 62nd Kōhaku (on December 31, 2011) will be the first time the Kōhaku to be broadcast entirely in digital. The 61st Kōhaku was broadcast in Hi-Vision (high definition) between 19:30 and 23:45, with a five-minute break for news between 21:25 and 21:30.

== Timeline ==
All events listed below occurred in 2010.

October 14
Date and time of broadcast announced. Theme announced as "Bonding through songs".
October 26
The mascots for Kohaku announced Uta♪Ukki-
November 3
Team leaders announced as Matsushita Nao for the red team and Arashi for the white team. This marks the first instance of a group (Arashi) being in charge of a team.
November 17
Announcement of the organizational group and radio broadcasting details on the official Kohaku Twitter.
November 24
Selected participants announced streaming on the internet and on live TV.
November 29
Start of the recruiting for the judges in the audience.

== Performers ==
The singers, announced on November 24, 2010, are ordered below according to the gojūon. Names in bold letters did not perform in the preceding year's program.

Red Team		White Team	
Singer / Group Name	Appearances	Singer / Group Name	Appearances
aiko	9	Arashi	2
Angela Aki	5	Hiroshi Itsuki	40
Ikimono-gakari	4	HY	Debut
Sayuri Ishikawa	33	Exile	6
Kana Uemura	Debut	NYC	2
AKB48	3	Yūzō Kayama	17
Miyuki Kawanaka	23	Saburō Kitajima	47
Kumiko	Debut	Hiromi Go	23
Kumi Koda	6	Kobukuro	6
Natsuko Godai	17	SMAP	18
Sachiko Kobayashi	32	Tokio	17
Fuyumi Sakamoto	22	Hideaki Tokunaga	5
Yoshimi Tendō	15	AAA	Debut
Dreams Come True	14	Kiyoshi Hikawa	11
Mitsuko Nakamura	15	Funky Monkey Babys	2
Kana Nishino	Debut	Masaharu Fukuyama	3
Perfume	3	Flumpool	2
Ayumi Hamasaki	12	Takashi Hosokawa	34
Ayaka Hirahara	7	Porno Graffitti	9
Nana Mizuki	2	Shinichi Mori	43
Kaori Mizumori	8	Yusuke Kamiji	2
Akiko Wada	34	L'Arc-en-Ciel	4

=== Performance listing ===
Red Team		White Team
Singer	Song	Singer	Song
First-half
Ayumi Hamasaki (12)	"Virgin Road"	Exile (6)	"I Wish For You"
AKB48 (3)	Kōhaku 2010 AKB48 Kamikyokutachi SP	NYC (2)	"Yoku Asobi Yoku Manabe 100% NYC"
Angela Aki (5)	"Kagayaku Hito"	AAA (debut)	"Aitai Riyū"
Mitsuko Nakamura (15)	"Kawachi Otoko Bushi"	Flumpool (2)	"Kimi ni Todoke"
Ayaka Hirahara (7)	"Voyagers"	Yusuke (2)	"Hito"
Natsuko Godai (17)	"Hitori Zake"	Takashi Hosokawa (34)	"Naniwabushi da yo Jinsei wa"
Kana Nishino (debut)	"Best Friend"	Porno Graffitti (9)	"Kimi wa 100%"
Miyuki Kawanaka (23)	"Nirinkusa"	Funky Monkey Babys (2)	"Ato Hitotsu"
Kumiko (debut)	"Inori"	HY (debut)	"Toki wo Koe"
Kaori Mizumori (8)	"Matsushima Kikō"	Hideaki Tokunaga (5)	"Toki no Nagare ni Mi wo Makase"
Nana Mizuki (2)	"Phantom Minds"	L'Arc-en-Ciel (4)	"Bless"
Yoshimi Tendo (15)	"Jinsei Michizure"	Shinichi Mori (43)	"Erimo Misaki"
Second-half
aiko (9)	"Mukai Awase"	Hiromi Go (23)	Go!Go!Year Kōhaku Special Medley
Perfume (3)	"Nee"	Tokio (17)	"Advance"
Kumi Koda (6)	Kumi Koda 2010 Special Medley	Hiroshi Itsuki (40)	"Oshiroi Hana"
Akiko Wada (34)	Akkoii! Kōhaku 2010 Special	Yūzō Kayama (17)	Wakadaisho 50-nen! Special Medley
Sachiko Kobayashi (32)	"Kaachan no Hitorigoto"	Masaharu Fukuyama (3)	"Michishirube"
Kana Uemura (debut)	"Toilet no Kamisama"	Kobukuro (6)	"Ryūsei"
		Arashi (2)	2010 Kōhaku Original Medley
Ikimono-gakari (3)	"Arigatō"	Arashi (2)	2010 Kōhaku Original Medley
Sayuri Ishikawa (33)	"Amagi Goe"	Saburō Kitajima (47)	"Fusetsu Nagare Tabi"
Fuyumi Sakamoto (22)	"Mata Kimi ni Koishiteru"	Kiyoshi Hikawa (11)	"Nijiiro no Bayon"
Dreams Come True	"Ikite Yuku no Desu" feat. The Kōhaku Special Brass Band	SMAP (18)	"This is Love" '10 SP Medley

== Results ==
The winners were the white team, making it their 6th consecutive win since 2005 (the last red team win was in 2004). The table below documents the voting and points distribution:

Method	Red Team	White Team	Total
Total votes	367,645 votes	418,191 votes	785,836 votes
Number of votes via cellular phone	29,460 votes	51,543 votes	81,003 votes
Number of votes via 1seg	57,559 votes	69,343 votes	126,902 votes
Number of votes via digital TV poll	279,894 votes	295,637 votes	575,531 votes
Number of votes by NHK Hall audience (including judges)	732 votes	1,668 votes	2,400 votes

== See also ==
- Kōhaku Uta Gassen
