= Yoshimi Tendo =

Japanese enka singer (born 1954)

Yoshimi Tendo 天童 よしみ
- Born: Yoshimi Yoshida; September 26, 1954 (age 71); Tanabe, Wakayama, Japan
- Genres: Enka, anime song
- Occupation: Singer
- Instrument: Singing
- Years active: 1970–present
- Labels: Pony Canyon (1970–1984); Teichiku Records (1985–present)
- Website: Official website

Yoshimi Yoshida (吉田 芳美, Yoshida Yoshimi; born September 26, 1954), better known as Yoshimi Tendo (天童 よしみ, Tendō Yoshimi), is a Japanese enka singer. She made her debut in 1970, but only began to be recognised in 1985, after changing record company, releasing her hit single (道頓堀人情), which went on to sell over half a million copies.

She made her first NHK Red and White Song Festival performance in 1993, but was not selected to perform again until 1996, the year she released her biggest hit (珍島物語) and won the best singing award, establishing herself as one of the best female enka singers. And from 1996 onwards, Yoshimi has performed for 21 years consecutively in the prestigious year-end show.

== Discography ==
=== Singles ===
| Year | Title | Notes |
|---|---|---|
| 1970 | "Dai-chan Kazoeuta" | |
| 1970 | "Kazegafuku" | |
| 1971 | "Umare Shōwadesu" | |
| 1971 | "Kore de Kettei Itashimasu" | |
| 1972 | "Hitori Botchi no Onnanoko" | |
| 1972 | "Suna-iro no Shima" | |
| 1973 | "Onna Tobaku-shi" | |
| 1973 | "Suteba Chi Urami Uta" | |
| 1974 | "Umare Osaka desu" | |
| 1976 | "Onna no Ura Machi" | |
| 1978 | "Michinoku Bojō" | |
| 1980 | "Mikoshi Yarō" | Duet with Joji Yamamoto |
| 1981 | "Kamome to Iu na no Sakaba" | |
| 1984 | "Ninkyō Aizu Heya" | |
| 1985 | "Dōtonbori Ninjō" | |
| 1986 | "Tsumakoizake" | |
| 1987 | "Matatabi" | |
| 1987 | "Hokkai Meoto-bushi" | |
| 1988 | "Otoko Dōshi" | |
| 1988 | "Ko se Bangaichi" | |
| 1988 | "Miren-bashi Modorigawa" | Duet with Makoto Fujita |
| 1988 | "Abare Genkai" | |
| 1989 | "Ore no Michizure" | |
| 1989 | "Meoto Kaidō" | |
| 1991 | "Omae" | |
| 1991 | "Kazaguruma" | |
| 1992 | "Yoi-gokoro" | |
| 1993 | "Sake Kizuna" | |
| 1994 | "Mukai-fū" | |
| 1994 | "Wasure Sake" | |
| 1995 | "Tabi Makura" | |
| 1996 | "Chindo Monogatari" | |
| 1997 | "Kyōshū: Ware-tachite" | |
| 1998 | "2008-nen Osaka Hana Ondo" | |
| 1998 | "Jinsei Shimijimi..." | |
| 1998 | "Kita no Tomoshibi" | Duet with Hiroshi Itsuki |
| 1999 | "Yume Koi-uta" | |
| 1999 | "Itadakimasu" | |
| 2000 | "Yoake" | |
| 2001 | "Damatte Ore ni Tsuite Koi" | |
| 2001 | "Harugakita" | |
| 2002 | "Anta no Hanamichi" | |
| 2002 | "Ume Ichi Rin" | |
| 2002 | "Onna no Hanagasaku" | |
| 2003 | "Yume Uguisu" | |
| 2003 | "Chō Yanagi Monogatari" | |
| 2003 | "Utsukushī Mukashi" | |
| 2004 | "Utsukushī Mukashi (New Version)" | |
| 2004 | "Otoko no Yoake" | |
| 2005 | "Hanafubuki" | |
| 2005 | "Ki" | |
| 2006 | "Inochi no Kagiri" | |
| 2006 | "Kurenai Zukin Sanjō" | |
| 2007 | "Nande Naku" | |
| 2007 | "Kumori no Chi Hare" | |
| 2007 | "Biwa no Mi no Naru Koro" | |
| 2008 | "Shiawase wa Sugu Soko ni..." | |
| 2008 | "Shiawase wa Sugu Soko ni... (Serif Iri)" | |
| 2009 | "Hanaikada" | |
| 2010 | "Jinsei-michizure" | |
| 2010 | "Bokoi Karasu" | |
| 2011 | "Futari no Funauta" | |
| 2011 | "Pan no Mimi" | |
| 2011 | "Anjō Yaretara e Yanai no" | |
| 2012 | "Onna no Sanga" | |
| 2012 | "Ginza no Koi no Monogatari" | Duet with Yujiro Ishihara |
| 2012 | "Soran Matsuri-bushi" | |
| 2013 | "Furusato Ginga" | |
| 2013 | "Matsuri-bayashi ga Kikoetara" | Duet with Masafumi Akikawa |
| 2013 | "Kujakugai no Uta" | |
| 2014 | "Hitokoe Ichi-dai" | |

=== Albums ===
| Year | Title | Notes | Ref. |
|---|---|---|---|
| 1971 | Enka no Shinsei | | |
| 1971 | Enka | | |
| 1972 | Enka no Shinzui | | |
| 1973 | Teppō-bushi | | |
| 1973 | Osaka Enka | | |
| 1974 | Takashi Tendo Shin Kawachi Ondo/Shin Minyō Gōshūondo Kuzushi | | |
| 1976 | Shin Kawachi Ondo | | |
| 1978 | Takashi Tendo Shin Kawachi Ondo Kinokuniyabunzaemon Shimatsu-ki | | |
| 1994 | Enka Kiwametsuke | | |
| 1994 | Takashi Tendo Shin Kawachi Ondo | | |
| 1995 | Nesshō! Yoshimi Tendo Gōshūondo Kuzushi Takashi Tendo Enka-shū | | |
| 1999 | Takashi Tendo no Genryū Makehen de! | | |
| 2008 | Best Collection | | |

== Filmography ==
=== Advertisements ===
| Title | Notes |
|---|---|
| Nobel Confectionery "VC3000 no Do Ame" | |
| Seiwa Corporation | |
| Pokka Crystal Black | |

=== Film ===
| Year | Title | Role | Notes | Ref. |
|---|---|---|---|---|
| 2023 | Yudo: The Way of the Bath | | | |
| 2023 | Bad Lands | | | |
| 2023 | Fly Me to the Saitama: From Biwa Lake with Love | Wakayama Liberation Front member | | |

=== TV series ===
| Year | Title | Role | Network | Notes |
|---|---|---|---|---|
| | Yanchakure | Sayuri Shiratori | NHK | |
| | heaven cannot wait | | TBS | Episode 6; Special appearance |
| | Okan | Mitsuko Kitamura | YTV | Lead role |
| | Yoshimi Tendo no Utahime Tantei | Kozue Amakusa | Fuji TV | |
| | Mito Kōmon | Okou | TBS | Series 34 Episode 17 |
| | Imo Takona 'n Kin | Fukuko Minamino | NHK | |
| | Kiyoshi to Yoshimi no Naniwa Night Show | | NHK | |

=== NHK Kōhaku Uta Gassen ===
| Year/No. | No. | Single | Order of appearance | Opponent | Remarks |
|---|---|---|---|---|---|
| 1993/44th | 1st | "Sake Kizuna" | 4/26 | Gen Takayama | |
| 1997/48th | 2nd | "Chindō Monogatari" | 15/25 | Kenichi Mikawa | |
| 1998/49th | 3rd | "Jinsei Shimijimi..." | 23/25 | SMAP | |
| 1999/50th | 4th | "Kawa no Nagare no Yō ni" | 26/27 | Hiroshi Itsuki | Tori-mae (1st) |
| 2000/51st | 5th | "Dōtonbori Ninjō" | 28/28 | Hiroshi Itsuki (2nd) | Tori (1st) |
| 2001/52nd | 6th | "Harugakita" | 26/27 | Hiroshi Itsuki (3rd) | Tori-mae (2nd) |
| 2002/53rd | 7th | "Anta no Hanamichi" | 26/27 | Saburō Kitajima | Tori-mae (3rd) |
| 2003/54th | 8th | "Utsukushī Mukashi" | 30/30 | SMAP (2nd) | Tori (2nd) |
| 2004/55th | 9th | "Otoko no Yoake" | 27/28 | Ken Hirai | Tori-mae (4th) |
| 2005/56th | 10th | "Kawa no Nagare no Yō ni" (2nd) | 29/29 | SMAP (3rd) | Tori (3rd) |
| 2006/57th | 11th | "Inochi no Kagiri" | 24/27 | Kobukuro | |
| 2007/58th | 12th | "Chindō Monogatari: Kizuna" (2nd) | 22/27 | Saburō Kitajima (2nd) | |
| 2008/59th | 13th | "Dōtonbori Ninjō" (2nd) | 25/26 | Shinichi Mori | Tori-mae (5th) |
| 2009/60th | 14th | "Hanaikada" | 8/25 | Kenichi Mikawa (2nd) | |
| 2010/61st | 15th | "Jinsei-michizure" | 12/24 | Shinichi Mori (2nd) | Zenhan Tori |
| 2011/62nd | 16th | "Ai SanSan" | 24/25 | Saburō Kitajima (3rd) | Tori-ma (6th) |
| 2012/63rd | 17th | "Soran Matsuri-bushi" | 18/25 | Kazuyoshi Saito | |
| 2013/64th | 18th | "Furusato Ginga" | 9/26 | Linked Horizon | |
| 2014/65th | 19th | "Yappa Sukiya Nen" | 10/25 | Hideaki Tokunaga | |
| 2015/66th | 20th | "Jinsei Ichiro" | 12/26 | Kanjani Eight | Zenhan Tori (2nd) |
