= Miki Sumiyoshi =

Miki Sumiyoshi (住吉美紀, Sumiyoshi Miki, born 1973) is a freelance Japanese announcer. She worked for the public broadcaster NHK. Miki was born in Kawasaki, and moved with her family to Seattle, Washington in the United States. She returned to Japan while in elementary school, and completed junior high school in Kobe. She then moved to Vancouver in Canada, graduating from high school, and again to Japan, where she attended and graduated from International Christian University.

In 1996, she joined NHK. Her career has taken her to positions in Fukushima, Sendai, and Tokyo, where she now works.

Miki regularly appeared in three regular television programs, and in a fourth, which is broadcast occasionally. She has done music, news, information, nature and other genres.

She hosted the radio broadcast of the 55th NHK Kōhaku Uta Gassen, NHK's annual New Year's Eve spectacular, and was selected to co-host the 58th NHK Kōhaku Uta Gassen.
