= Maya Sakura =

- Born: 草野 真耶 (Maya Kusano); 26 July 1998 (age 28)
- Origin: Obihiro, Hokkaidō, Japan
- Genres: Enka
- Occupations: Singer, actress
- Years active: 2008–present
- Label: Nippon Crown
- Website: Public website

Maya Sakura (さくら まや, Sakura Maya; born Maya Kusano (草野 真耶) on 26 July 1998 in Obihiro, Hokkaidō, Japan) is an enka singer and child actress. In 2008, she made her debut with the single "Tairyō Matsuri" (大漁まつり) at the age of 10. In 2009, she received a "New Artist" award at the 51st Annual Japan Record Awards, becoming the youngest person to do so.

She also appeared as a special guest on the 60th Kōhaku Uta Gassen in the "children's Kōhaku" section of the program.

== Biography ==
Maya Sakura is the child of two successful restaurant owners. Her hobbies include reading. She began to learn to play the violin aged two and a half, and the piano aged three. She is also trained in ballet and solfège. In 2004, she was awarded the gold medal in the Nationwide Children's Singing Competition (全国童謡歌唱コンクール), after which she began to pursue a career in enka.

On 3 December 2008, she made her Nippon Crown debut with the song "Tairyō Matsuri", as the youngest enka singer in history. Three days later on 6 December, she sang at the Asakusa public gardens.

Due to her increasing popularity and busy work schedule, she transferred to a Tokyo school in 2009.
