= Junko Akimoto =

Japanese kayōkyoku singer (born 1947)

Junko Akimoto 秋元 順子
- Born: June 21, 1947 (age 79); Koto, Tokyo, Japan
- Genres: Kayōkyoku, chanson, canzone, jazz, min'yō
- Occupation: Singer
- Years active: 2004–present
- Label: King Records
- Website: akimoto-junko.sakura.ne.jp

Junko Akimoto (秋元 順子, Akimoto Junko; born June 21, 1947 in Tokyo) is a Japanese kayōkyoku singer. She also sings jazz, chanson, canzone, and min'yō. She made her debut in 2005. She attended the 59th NHK Kōhaku Uta Gassen. Her song "Ai no Mama de" (愛のままで, Still in Love) reached number-one on Japan's Oricon charts in January 2009. This song made her the eldest singer to reach the number-one position on single charts in Oricon history. The single was on the charts for 64 weeks and sold 568,334 copies during that time.

== Discography ==
=== Albums ===
- Madison-gun no Koi (マディソン郡の恋, Madison County Love) (2006)
- Second Story (2008)
- Aisuru Hito no Tame ni (愛する人のために, For the People I Love) (2009)
- Encore: Jazz Standard (2010)
- Live Best ~kawaranu-ai~ (ライブベスト～変わらぬ愛～)
- Hana roman ~ serenāde (華浪漫～セレナーデ)
- Dear Songs ~yume o tsunaide~ (Dear Songs～夢をつないで～)
- Junko Akimoto BEST (2014)

=== Singles ===
- "Madison-gun no Koi" (マディソン郡の恋, Madison County Love) (2005)
- "Ame no Tabibito" (雨の旅人, Rain Traveller) (2007)
- "Ai no Mama de" (愛のままで, Still in Love) (2008)
- "Tasogare Love Again" (黄昏Love again, Evening Love Again) (2009)
- "Ichimai no Shashin" (一枚の写真, One Photograph) (2010)
- "Sono hana wa...~kawaranu-ai~" (その花は…～変わらぬ愛～)
- "Karenai hana" (枯れない花)
- "24-ji no kodoku" (24時の孤独)
- "Merīgōrando ~namida no okurimono~" (メリーゴーランド～涙の贈りもの～)
- "Aikagi" (愛鍵) (2015)
- "Rose" (2015)
- "Ti amo ~kaze ga fuite~" (ティ・アモ～風が吹いて～) (2016)
