= Natsuko Godai =

Japanese singer

Natsuko Godai 伍代夏子
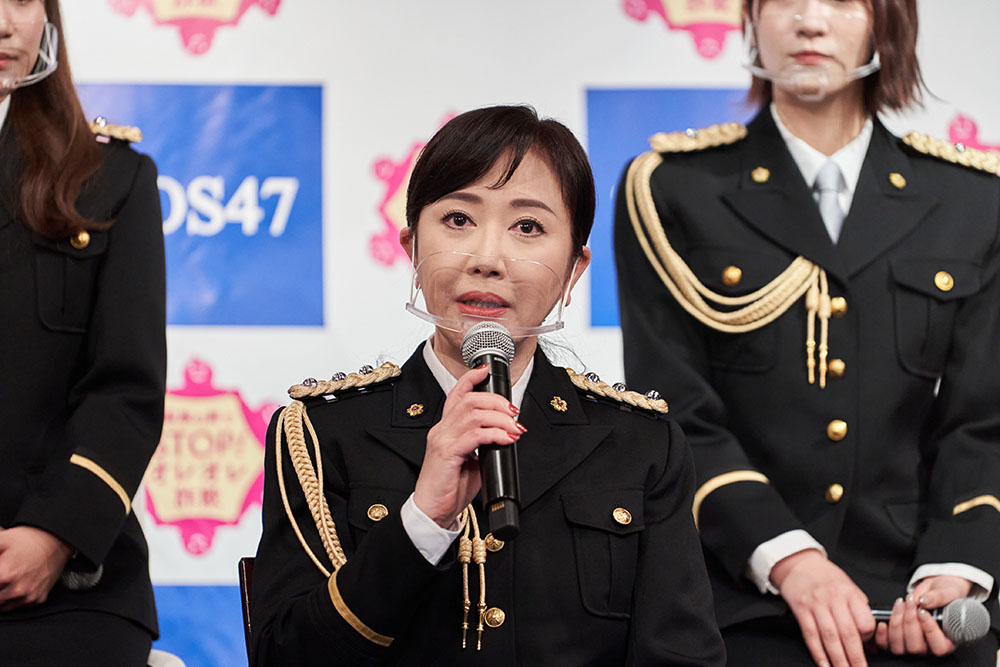
- taken December in 2021

Background information
- Birth name: Terumi Nakagawa 中川輝美 (before marriage); Terumi Yamada 山田輝美 (after marriage)
- Born: 18 December 1961; Shibuya, Tokyo, Japan
- Genres: Enka
- Occupation: Singer
- Years active: 1985-
- Labels: Sony Music Direct
- Website: Official Website

Natsuko Godai (伍代夏子), (born 18 December 1961), of Tokyo, Japan, is a Japanese enka singer.

== Career ==
In 1982, under the alias "Hiromi Hoshi", she debuted with "Koi no Ienakiko" ('恋の家なき子'), released by New Century Records. In April 1985, she used the name "Yuki Kagawa" with the song "Yoake Made Yokohama" ('夜明けまでヨコハマ'). In 1986, using her real name Terumi Nakagawa, she released the song "Yume Kizuna" ('夢きずな'). In 1987, she used the name Natsuko Godai, combining characters from the names of fellow Enka singers Hiroshi Itsuki and Aki Yashiro whom she greatly admired. Under that alias, she released her first major album, 'Modori Gawa' ('戻り川'). In 1990, she released the hit single Shinobu Ame and appeared in Kōhaku Uta Gassen for the first of more than 20 appearances. "Shinobu Ame" reached 12th in the Oricon Weekly Singles Chart.

She is the tourism ambassador for Ozu, Ehime prefecture.

== Personal life ==
She is the daughter of a fish dealer who had a storefront in Shibuya. In 1999, she married Ryōtarō Sugi.

== Awards ==
- 1988 Japan Cable Awards Best Newcomer Award
- 1990 Japan Enka Awards Enka Star Award
- 1990 Japan Music Awards Broadcast Music Award
- 1995 Japan Record Awards Special Award (with Fuyumi Sakamoto, Yōko Nagayama, Kaori Kozai, and Ayako Fuji)

== See also ==
- Ayako Fuji, born in the same year and also signed to Sony Music Direct
