= Ayako Fuji =

Fuji Ayako 藤あや子
- Born: Fujimura Manami 藤村真奈美; 10 May 1961 (age 65); Kakunodate, Akita
- Genre: Enka
- Occupation: Singer
- Years active: 1987-present
- Label: Sony Music Direct

Ayako Fuji (藤あや子, Fuji Ayako) (real name Manami Fujimura (藤村真奈美, Fujimura Manami), née Takahashi (高橋), born May 10, 1961) is a Japanese enka singer. She is signed onto Sony Music Japan. Born in Kakunodate, Akita, Fuji graduated from Akita Prefectural Kakunodate South High School.

== Enka career ==
Fuji made her enka debut on September 21, 1989.

== Releases (solo) ==
=== Hit songs ===
- Onna, 1990
- Ameyo Zake, 1991
- Kokoro Zake, 1992
- Murasaki Ujō, 1993
- Hana no Waltz, 1994
- Miren, 1995
- Utakata no Koi, 1998
- Yuki shin shin, 1998

=== Audio releases ===
- Ayako Fuji: Best Of Best, June 20, 2001
- Ayako Fuji zenkyokushu, November 11, 2001
- Koyoi zake, May 22, 2002
- Ryuhyoukoiuta, August 28, 2002
- Saigetsu, October 23, 2002
- Yorisoibashi, March 26, 2003
- Manjushaka, September 18, 2003
- Ayako Fuji Zenkyoku Shu, November 19, 2003
- Hanabira Bojo, February 18, 2004
- Yuki Koya, September 29, 2004
- Ayako Fuji Saishin Hit Zenkyokusyu, November 11, 2004
- Minato Komoriuta, May 18, 2005
- Fuji Ayako Saishin Hit Zenkyokushu'06, November 11, 2005
- Yoimachigusa, March 3, 2006
- Shizukana Yume [Limited Release], April 5, 2006
- Ayako Fuji Hit Kyoku Zenshu '07, November 8, 2006

=== Video releases ===
- Debut 10th Anniversary Recital - Hana Yurete 10 Nen, October 21, 1998
- Ayako Fuji Super Hit Video Vol.1, January 24, 2001
- Tokusen DVD Single - Minato Komoriuta, August 24, 2005

== Television ==
- Kōhaku Uta Gassen (15 appearances as of 57th event)

43rd 1992, Kokoro Zake
44th 1993, Murasaki Ujō
45th 1994, Hana no Waltz
46th 1995, Miren
47th 1996, Beni
48th 1997, Utakata no Koi
49th 1998, Yuki Shinshin
50th 1999, Onna no Magokoro
51st 2000, Futari Hana
52nd 2001, Futari no Kizuna
53rd 2002, Ryuhyoukoiuta
54th 2003, Manjushaka
55th 2004, Yuki Arano
56th 2005, Murasaki Ujō
57th 2006, Yuki Shinshin

- NHK Kayō Concert 「NHK歌謡コンサート」

== See also ==
- Natsuko Godai, born in the same year and also signed to Sony Music Direct
