= Kaori Kozai =

Japanese enka singer (born 1963)

Kaori Kozai (香西 かおり, Kōzai Kaori; born 28 August 1963 in Minato-ku, Osaka) is a Japanese enka singer. She won best vocalist at the 42nd Japan Record Awards in 2000.
