= Akiko Wada =

Japanese singer and tarento (born 1950)

- 和田 アキ子
- Born: Kim Bokja; April 10, 1950 (age 76); Tennōji-ku, Osaka, Osaka Prefecture, Japan
- Occupations: Singer; tarento; businesswoman
- Years active: 1968–present
- Agent: Horipro
- Height: 174 cm (5 ft 9 in)

Korean name
- Hangul: 김복자
- Hanja: 金福子
- RR: Gim Bokja
- MR: Kim Pokcha
- Website: www.ako50.com

Akiko Wada (和田 アキ子, Wada Akiko; born April 10, 1950) is an ethnically Korean/Japanese singer, tarento and businesswoman from Tennōji-ku, Osaka, Osaka Prefecture.

She has various nicknames, one being "Akko". Due to her above-average height (174 cm or 5’8.5"), she is also nicknamed jotei (女帝), meaning "empress".

== Biography ==
Akiko Wada is Japanese of Korean ethnicity. She was born Kim Bok-ja (Korean: 김복자; Hanja: 金福子, Kim is the family name). Like many Zainichi Koreans, she also had a Japanese-style name for everyday use, Fukuko Kaneumi (金海福子, Kaneumi Fukuko). When she took Japanese citizenship, her name became Akiko Wada (和田 現子, Wada Akiko), which upon marriage became Akiko Iizuka (飯塚 現子, Iizuka Akiko).

She is signed to the Horipro entertainment agency.

== Career ==
At age 15, she dropped out of high school after 2 or 3 days due to her father arbitrarily delivering a note telling the school that Akiko would quit attending the school. Then Akiko started performing in clubs due to boredom. She was signed to the Horipro entertainment agency and released her debut single, "Hoshizora no Kodoku" in 1968 and had her first hit the next year with "Doshaburi no Ame no Naka de". She performed on Kōhaku Uta Gassen, a music show broadcast live every New Year's Eve, in 1970 and has performed over 30 times on the show since then. She received the award for Best Song at the 1972 Japan Record Awards for "Ano Kane wo Narasu no wa Anata".

She played the voice of Bowser in Super Mario Bros.: The Great Mission to Rescue Princess Peach!. She has also voiced Marge Simpson in the Japanese version of The Simpsons Movie. She appeared as a fictionalized version of herself in Yakuza Kiwami 3 & Dark Ties, referred to as Akko-san.

She also performed with the music group M-Flo on the song "Hey!" on their 2005 album Beat Space Nine.

Wada performed at the famous Apollo Theater in Harlem, New York in September 2008 as part of her 40th debut anniversary tour.

== Kōhaku Uta Gassen appearances ==
| Number | Year | Song | Appearance order | Opponent | Remarks |
|---|---|---|---|---|---|
| 21 | 1970 | 笑って許して (Waratte Yurushite, "Laugh and Forgive") | 2/24 | Mizuhara Hiroshi | Kōhaku debut |
| 22 | 1971 | 天使になれない (Tenshi ni Narenai, "Can't be an Angel") | 3/25 | Kenichi Mikawa | |
| 23 | 1972 | 孤独 (Kodoku, "Solitude") | 2/23 | Four Leaves | |
| 24 | 1973 | Waratte Yurushite (repeat) | 6/22 | Yukio Hashi | |
| 25 | 1974 | 美しき誤解 (Utsukushiki Gokai, "Beautiful Misunderstanding") | 10/25 | Kaientai | |
| 26 | 1975 | もっと自由に (Motto Jiyū ni, "More Freely") | 6/24 | DOWN TOWN BOOGIE WOOGIE BAND | |
| 27 | 1976 | 雨のサタデー (Ame no Satadē, "Rainy Saturday") | 7/24 | Hideki Saijo | |
| 28 | 1977 | 夜更けのレストラン (Yoake no Resutoran, "Break of dawn Restaurant") | 12/24 | Masao Sen | |
| 29 | 1978 | コーラス・ガール (Kōrasu Gāru, "Chorus Girl") | 13/24 | Masao Sen (2) | |
| 37 | 1986 | もう一度ふたりで歌いたい (Mō Ichido Futari de Utaitai, "Sing with the Two of Us Once More") | 12/20 | Sugawara Youichi | Returned after 8 years |
| 38 | 1987 | 抱擁 (Hōyō, "Embrace") | 20/20 | Hiroshi Itsuki | Host and finale for red team |
| 39 | 1988 | だってしょうがないじゃない (Datte Shōganai Janai, "Can't Be Helped") | 9/21 | Yoshi Ikuzō | Red team host |
| 40 | 1989 | Datte Shōganai Janai (repeat) | 19/20 | Shinji Tanimura | Host and penultimate performance for red team |
| 41 | 1990 | 抱かれ上手 (Dakare Jōzu, "Good at Being Held") | 27/29 | Saburō Kitajima | |
| 42 | 1991 | あの鐘を鳴らすのはあなた (Ano Kane o Narasu Nowa Anata, "You Are the One That Rings That Bell") | 28/28 | Shinji Tanimura (2) | Red team finale |
| 43 | 1992 | 愛、とどきますか (Ai, Todokimasuka?, "Does Love Reach You?") | 27/28 | Masashi Sada | Red team penultimate performance |
| 44 | 1993 | 星空の孤独 (Hoshizora no Kodoku, The Loneliness of The Starry Night) | 24/26 | Shinji Tanimura (3) | |
| 45 | 1994 | Ano Kane o Narasu Nowa Anata (repeat) | 22/25 | Akira Kobayashi | |
| 46 | 1995 | Mō Ichido Futari de Utaitai (repeat) | 25/25 | Takashi Hosokawa | Red team finale |
| 47 | 1996 | Mother | 20/25 | Masashi Sada (2) | |
| 48 | 1997 | 夢 (Yume, "Dream") | 24/25 | Saburō Kitajima (2) | Host and penultimate performance for red team |
| 49 | 1998 | 今あなたにうたいたい (Ima Anata ni Utaitai, "I Want to Sing to You Now") | 25/25 | Hiroshi Itsuki (2) | Show finale |
| 50 | 1999 | Ano Kane o Narasu Nowa Anata (repeat) | 27/27 | Saburō Kitajima (3) | Red team finale |
| 51 | 2000 | Mō Ichido Futari de Utaitai (repeat) | 27/28 | Saburō Kitajima (4) | Red team penultimate performance |
| 52 | 2001 | Yume (repeat) | 27/27 | Saburō Kitajima (5) | Red team finale |
| 53 | 2002 | Hōyō (repeat) | 25/27 | Masashi Sada (3) | |
| 54 | 2003 | 古い日記 2003 KOUHAKU Remix (Furui Nikki Kōhaku Rimikkusu, "Old Diary Kōhaku Remix") | 27/28 | Hiroshi Itsuki (3) | |
| 55 | 2004 | Ano Kane o Narasu Nowa Anata (repeat) | 22/28 | Yuzu | |
| 56 | 2005 | HEY! | 27/29 | Misato Watanabe | Appeared under white team |
| 57 | 2006 | Mother (repeat) | 23/27 | Masafumi Akikawa | |
| 58 | 2007 | Ano Kane o Narasu Nowa Anata (repeat) | 26/27 | Shinichi Mori | Red team penultimate performance |
| 59 | 2008 | Yume (repeat) | 26/26 | Kiyoshi Hikawa | Red team finale |
| 60 | 2009 | Mō Ichido Futari de Utaitai (repeat) | 22/25 | Kobukuro | |
| 61 | 2010 | AKKOィィッ!紅白2010スペシャル (Akko! Kōhaku 2010 Supesharu); Medley consisting of 人生はこれから (Jinsei wa Korekara), Waratte Yurushite (repeat), Furui Nikki (repeat) | 16/22 | Yūzō Kayama | |
| 62 | 2011 | Ano Kane o Narasu Nowa Anata (repeat) | 19/25 | Arashi | |
| 63 | 2012 | Ai, Todokimasuka? (repeat) | 21/25 | Akihiro Miwa | |
| 64 | 2013 | 今でもあなた (Ima Demo Anata) | 17/26 | Tokio | |
| 65 | 2014 | 古い日記〜2014紅白スペシャル〜 (Furui Nikki 2014 Supesharu) | 11/23 | V6 | First half finale |
| 66 | 2015 | Waratte Yurushite (repeat) | 11/25 | Takashi Hosokawa (2) | |
