= Miyuki Kawanaka =

Japanese enka singer

Miyuki Kawanaka (川中 美幸, Kawanaka Miyuki; December 5, 1955) is a Japanese enka singer. Her singing career spanned over four decades. She married Katsuo Yamada in 1991.

== Early life ==
Kawanaka was born Kimiko Kawanaka in Yonago, Tottori. At a young age, she moved to Suita, Osaka where she grew up.

In 1973, at age 18, she debuted as Kasuga Harumi and tried to become a pop idol with the release of the songs "Shinjuku Tenshin" and "Kantsubaki no Shima Kara". Both singles failed and she returned to Osaka to work at her mother's okonomiyaki restaurant.

In 1976, she won a contest singing "Anatani Inochi Gake". She adopted stage name Miyuki Kawanaka and launched her second debut as an enka singer. In 1980 Kawanaka's single Futarizake (ふたり酒) hit, with sales over a million copies.

Her second biggest hit, "Niren-sou" (二輪草) in 1998, which sold more than a million copies in Japan alone, spending 80 weeks in the top 100 of the oricon chart.

Kawanaka was invited to perform at the annual NHK Red and White Song Festival for 24 non-consecutive years, the 7th most on the all-time list for a female artist. Her last appearance at the prestigious programme was 2011, the 62nd edition of the show.

== Discography ==
Original works charting in the top 100.

Album name	Year
Risking My Life For You	1977
Two Drinks	1980
About Two	1981
Anata Hitosuji	1981
Hanasakiminato	1982
Echizenmisaki	1982
Intoxicated	1982
You and Me	1983
Ferryboat Resort	1983
The Rain That Keeps Us In	1983
Two People's Spring	1984
Hidden River	1984
Aren't You a Man?	1985
Snow Dividing Oshoro Coast	1985
Two People's Bonds	1986
Naniwa Glow	1986
Love Song's Channel	1987
Bungosuidou	1988
Woman Crying Sea of Japan's Tears	1988
It's a Moonlit Night, Right?	1989
Takoyaki Life	1990
Gulping Down Sake	1990
Your Spring	1991
Blazing Love Song	1991
Dream Chasing Woman	1992
Wishing for a Port Town Long Ago	1993
Kitayama Drizzle	1995
Paper Lantern Flower	1996
Once More, a Love Song	1996
Beautiful Woman Reika	1997
Soft Windflower	1998
Eisou ~Lily of the Valley~	1999
Naniwa Woman	2000
Business Trip Story	2000
Two People's Spring	2001
River's Flow	2001
Evening Showers	2002
Kifune's Inn	2002
Your Whole Life	2003
Interesting Woman	2004
Mother Weather	2004
Light Snow on the Grass	2005
One Straight Song	2006
Tourounagashi	2006
Kanazawa Rain	2006
Fuufuchyanrin	2007
Kiso River Drizzle	2008
Glazed Over Feeling	2009
Two People's Flowers	2010
Nagasaki Rain	2011
Hanabouro ~Hoarfrost Inn~	2012
Famous Scene	2012
Poet	2012
Pair of Sakura	2013
I Love Osaka	2013
Gion Woman	2014
