= Kenichi Mikawa =

Japanese singer and TV personality (born 1946)

- 美川 憲一
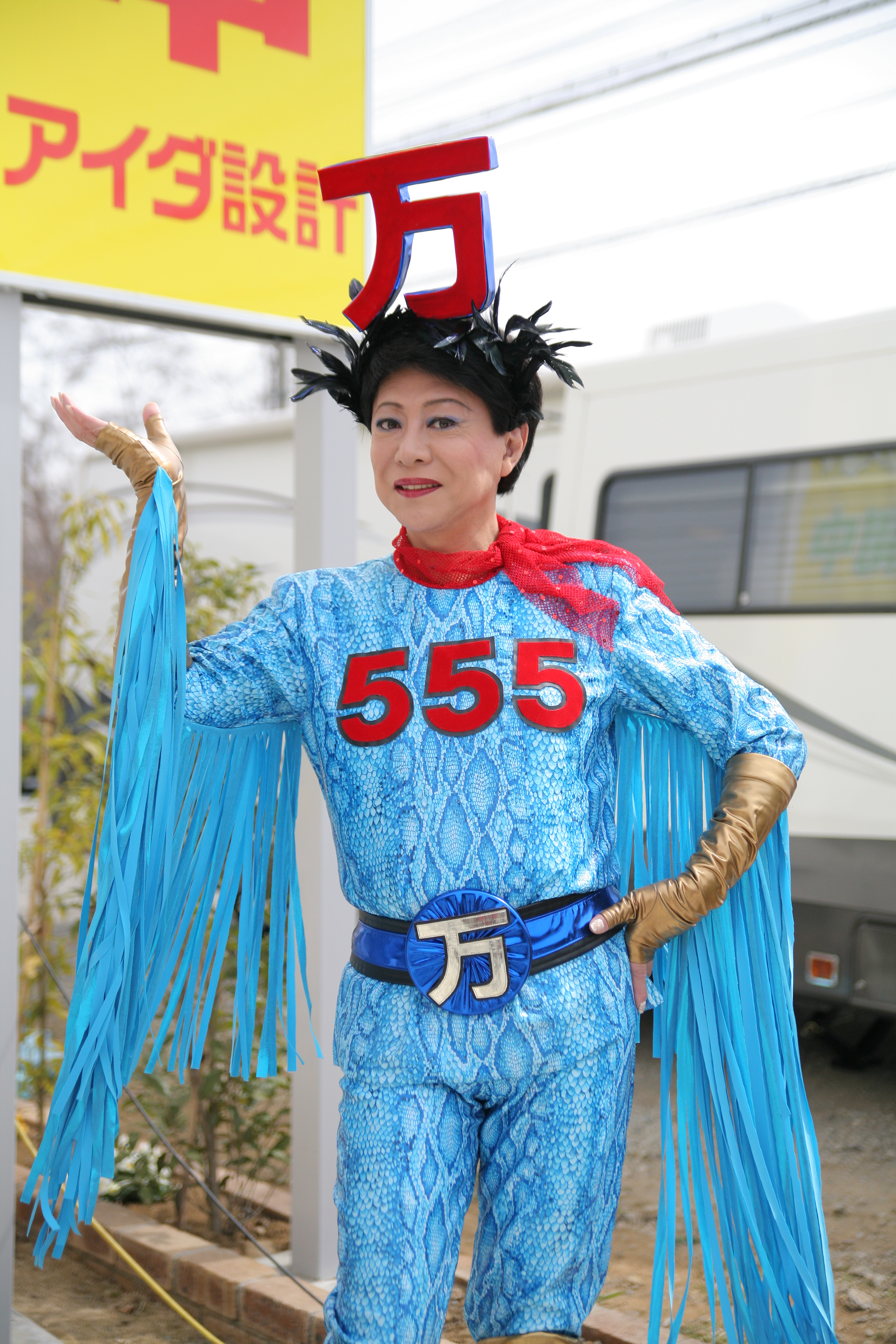
- 2014
- Born: Yoshikazu Momose; 15 May 1946 (age 80); Suwa, Nagano Japan
- Occupations: TV personality, singer
- Website: https://web.archive.org/web/20090309043834/http://www.ab-promotion.co.jp/mikawa/index.html

Kenichi Mikawa (美川 憲一, Mikawa Ken'ichi; born 15 May 1946) is a Japanese singer and TV personality, known for his outspoken views and onē (オネー, effeminate; literally elder sister) style.

Mikawa was born in Suwa, Nagano as Yoshikazu Momose (百瀬 由一, Momose Yoshikazu). He recorded a number of hit songs as a male enka singer in the 1960s and 1970s. The most well-known of his songs include "Sasoriza no Onna" and "Yanagase Blues". His career went into decline in the mid-1970s, but revived about 10 years later when he adopted his current style. He makes frequent appearances on TV talk and variety shows, and is also known as a regular performer on Kōhaku Uta Gassen, the popular New Year's Eve music show. One of the highlights of that show is his annual contest with enka singer Sachiko Kobayashi for the most elaborate costume.

Mikawa is openly gay.

== Discography ==
- Dakedo Dakedo Dakedo (だけどだけどだけど) (1965)
- Yanagase Blues (柳ヶ瀬ブルース) (1966)
- Niigata Blues (新潟ブルース) (1967)
- Kushiro no Yoru (釧路の夜) (1968)
- Onna To Bara (女とバラ) (1969)
- Miren Machi (みれん町) (1970)
- Omoide Onna (想い出おんな) (1971)
- Uragiri No Machi (うらぎりの町) (1972)
- Ginza Onna Ame (銀座・おんな・雨) (1972)
- Sasoriza No Onna (さそり座の女) (1972)
- Hashyagisugitanone (はしゃぎすぎたのね) (1974)
- Ai wa Jerashii (愛は嫉妬(ジェラシー)) (2009)
