= Takashi Hosokawa =

Hosokawa Takashi 細川たかし
- Birth name: Hosokawa Takashi (細川貴志)
- Also known as: Takashi Hosokawa (細川たかし)
- Born: 15 June 1950 (age 74)
- Origin: Makkari, Abuta District, Hokkaidō, Japan
- Genres: Enka
- Occupation: Singer
- Years active: 1975–present
- Website: www.kazukikaku.com

Takashi Hosokawa (細川たかし), born 細川貴志 (Hosokawa Takashi) on 15 June 1950, Makkari, Abuta District, Hokkaidō, Japan) is a Japanese enka singer.

In 1975, he debuted with the song "Kokoro Nokori". Hosokawa immediately became one of the most popular enka and pop singers in Japan. He took part in the Kōhaku Uta Gassen for 32 consecutive years, but he was finally forced to reject NHK's offer in 2007 due to the Enten controversy. He returned to take part in the 2009 edition and continued until 2015.

== Discography ==
#	Title	Release date
1	"Kokoro Nokori" (心のこり)	1 April 1975
2	"Miren Gokoro" (みれん心)	1 September 1975
3	"Onna no Jūjiro" (女の十字路, "Woman's Crossroads")	1 February 1976
4	"Okitegami" (置き手紙, "Discarded Letter")	1 July 1976
5	"Kita no Ryoshū" (北の旅愁, "Lonely Journey Northwards")	1 October 1976
6	"Onna no Haru" (おんなの春, "Woman's Summer")	4 October 1977
7	"Hitori Tabi" (ひとり旅, "Travelling Alone")	9 October 1977
8	"Tōi Akari" (遠い灯り, "Distant Light")	1 March 1978
9	"Nukumori" (ぬくもり)	1 July 1978
10	"Minato Yakei" (港夜景)	1 October 1978
12	"Yukizuri" (ゆきずり)	1 September 1979
13	"Issho ni Kurasō" (一緒に暮らそう)	1 April 1980
14	"Shiawase Ondo" (しあわせ音頭)	1 June 1980
15	"Hotaru Kusa" (ほたる草)	1 September 1980
16	"Itsuka Doko ka de" (いつかどこかで, "Someday, Somewhere")	1 February 1981
17	"Onnagokoro" (女ごころ, "Female Instinct")	25 July 1981
18	"Kita Sakaba" (北酒場, "Northern Tavern")	25 March 1982
19	"Yagiri no Watashi" (矢切の渡し)	21 February 1983
20	"Shinjuku Jōwa" (新宿情話, "Shinjuku Love Story")	1 January 1984
21	"Hoshizuku no Machi" (星屑の街, "Stardust City")	1 June 1984
22	"Naniwabushi da yo Jinsei wa" (浪花節だよ人生は)	21 August 1984
23	"Sakaba de Aba yo" (酒場であばよ)	1 March 1985
24	"Nippon Rettō Tabi Karasu" (日本列島旅鴉)	21 April 1985
25	"Bōkyō jon Kara" (望郷じょんから)	21 August 1985
26	"Yukemuri Jōwa" (湯けむり情話)	21 April 1986
27	"Sadame Kawa" (さだめ川)	21 August 1986
28	"Yumereki" (夢暦)	21 March 1987
29	"Hoshi ga Mite ita" (星が見ていた, "Stargazing")	21 October 1987
30	"Hokui Gojū" (北緯五十, "15 Degrees North")	1 February 1988
31	"Seichō Osomatsubushi" (正調 おそ松節)	21 March 1988
32	"Jinsei Kōro" (人生航路)	21 March 1989
33	"Kitaguni e" (北国へ, "To the North-lands")	11 October 1989
34	"Otoko no Himatsuri" (男の火祭り)	17 April 1990
35	"Hoshi ga Mite ita" (星が見ていた, "Stargazing")	21 August 1990
36	"Ukare Bushi" (うかれ節)	21 September 1990
37	"Aa, Ii Onna" (ああ、いい女)	1 January 1991
38	"Ōenka, Ikimasu" (応援歌、いきます)	1 May 1991
39	"Sado no Koi Uta" (佐渡の恋唄, "Sado Love Song")	1 December 1991
40	"Koi no Sake" (恋の酒)	1 May 1993
41	"Jinsei Kibō to Shinbō da" (人生希望と辛抱だ)	21 September 1993
42	"Haha Koi Karasu" (母恋鴉)	1 January 1994
43	"Hokuto no Hoshi" (北斗の星)	1 April 1994
44	"Yume Yoi Jin" (夢酔い人)	21 November 1994
45	"Futari Michi" (ふたり道, "Two Paths")	19 August 1995
46	"Onna no Shigure" (女のしぐれ)	21 August 1996
47	"Fuyu no Yado" (冬の宿)	21 August 1997
48	"Inochi Fune" (いのち舟)	28 February 1998
49	"Futaba San" (双葉山, "Mt. Futaba")	22 August 1998
50	"Yume no Yume ~Chikamatsu Shinjū Monogatari~" (夢のゆめ～近松心中物語～)	1 February 1999
51	"Shigure no Minato" (しぐれの港)	19 June 1999
52	"Yukikō" (雪港)	1 January 2000
53	"Iki na Sake" (粋な酒)	1 July 2000
54	"Kita no Goban Machi" (北の五番町)	18 August 2001
55	"Kono Aoi Sora ni wa" (この蒼い空には, "This Blue Sky")	1 March 2002
56	"Gasshō – Kaze no Yado" (合掌 風の宿)	20 July 2002
57	"Daikarasu ~Kokyō no Shino n de~" (大鴉～故郷偲んで～)	19 February 2003
56	"Yoake no Shussen" (夜明けの出船, "Sailing at Dawn")	20 August 2003
57	"Fūfu Gokoro" (夫婦ごころ)	1 January 2004
58	"Shimokita Ryōka" (下北漁歌)	25 August 2004
59	"Kinosaki Koiuta" (城崎恋歌)	19 January 2005
60	"Ayairo no Koi" (あやいろの恋)	15 February 2006
61	"Ojiro Washi" (オジロ鷲)	20 September 2006
62	"Manten no Funauta" (満天の船歌)	21 March 2007
63	"Koi Yadori ~Ginzan Yakei~" (恋宿り～銀山夜景～)	21 May 2008
