= NHK Hall =

Concert hall in Shibuya, Tokyo, Japan

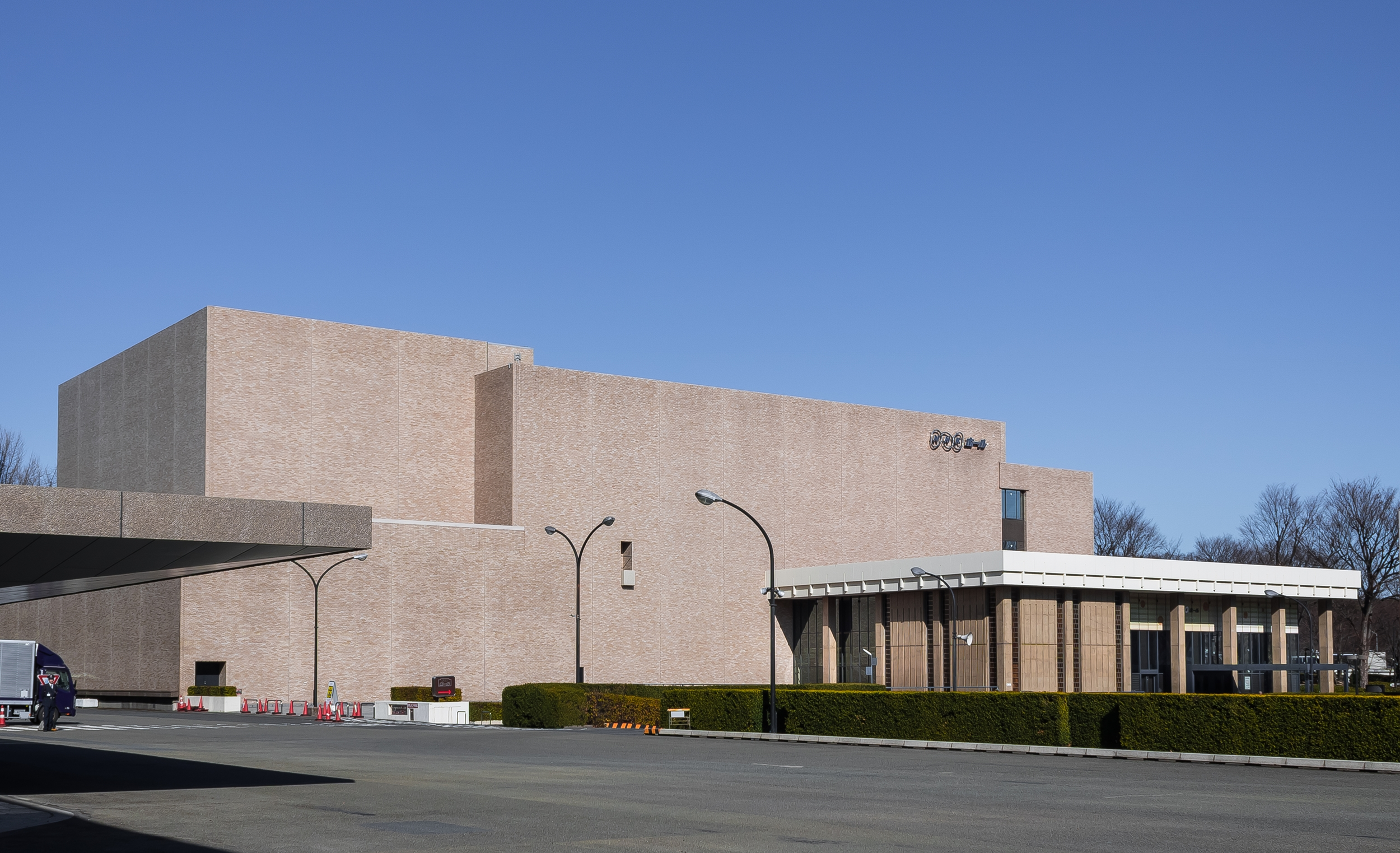
- Interactive map of NHK Hall
- Location: Shibuya, Tokyo, Japan
- Coordinates: 35°39′58.85″N 139°41′50.56″E
- Owner: NHK Service Center
- Seating type: Reserved
- Capacity: 3,800
- Type: concert hall
- Public transit: Chiyoda Line at Yoyogi-Koen; Yamanote Line at Harajuku

Construction
- Built: 1972
- Opened: 20 June 1973
- Renovated: 2021-2022

Website
- nhk-sc

The NHK Hall is a concert hall located at the NHK Broadcasting Center, the main headquarters of Japan's public broadcaster NHK. The hall is the main venue for the NHK Symphony Orchestra, but it has also played host to other events, such as the 1979 Japan Music Awards and NHK's annual New Year's Eve special Kōhaku Uta Gassen.

== History ==
The original NHK Hall opened in 1955 at a location in Tokyo's Uchisaiwai-cho district. Several live programmes were broadcast from the hall, such as Song Plaza, Kōhaku Uta Gassen, and Personal Secrets. In 1973, a new NHK Hall was established in Shibuya, Tokyo, at the site of NHK's new headquarters, the NHK Broadcasting Center.

The acoustics for the hall were designed by Minoru Nagata, later of Nagata Acoustics, while TOA Corporation provided the hall's sound equipment.

On April 9, 2019, it was announced that it will be closed from March 2021 to June 2022 due to seismic retrofitting, construction, renovation and reopening. The 72nd Kōhaku Uta Gassen, broadcast on 31 December 2021, was held at the Tokyo International Forum. It was held outside the NHK Hall for the first time in 49 years since the 23rd edition in 1972 and for the first time since the hall started operation.

== Gallery ==
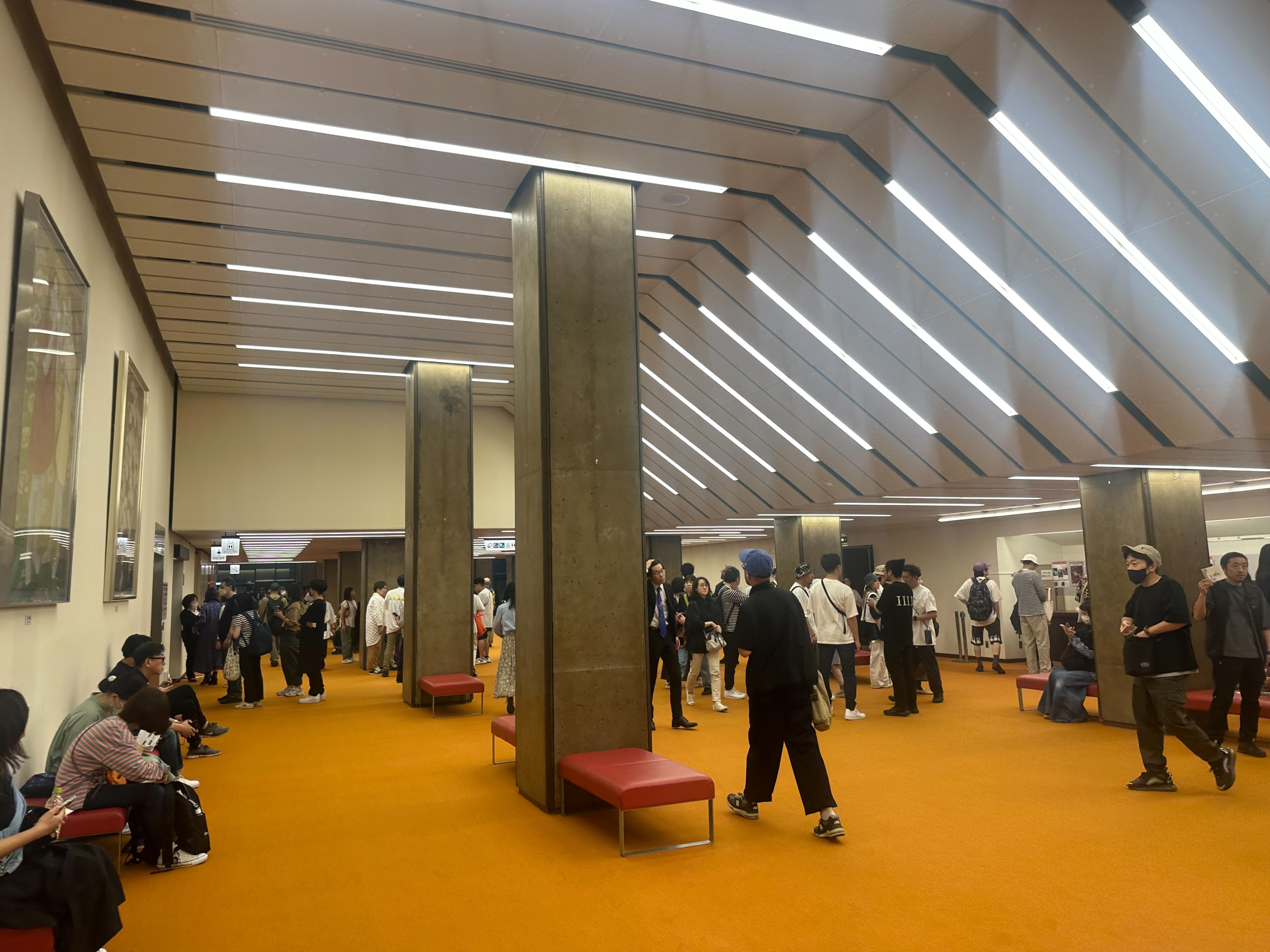
Inside NHK Hall

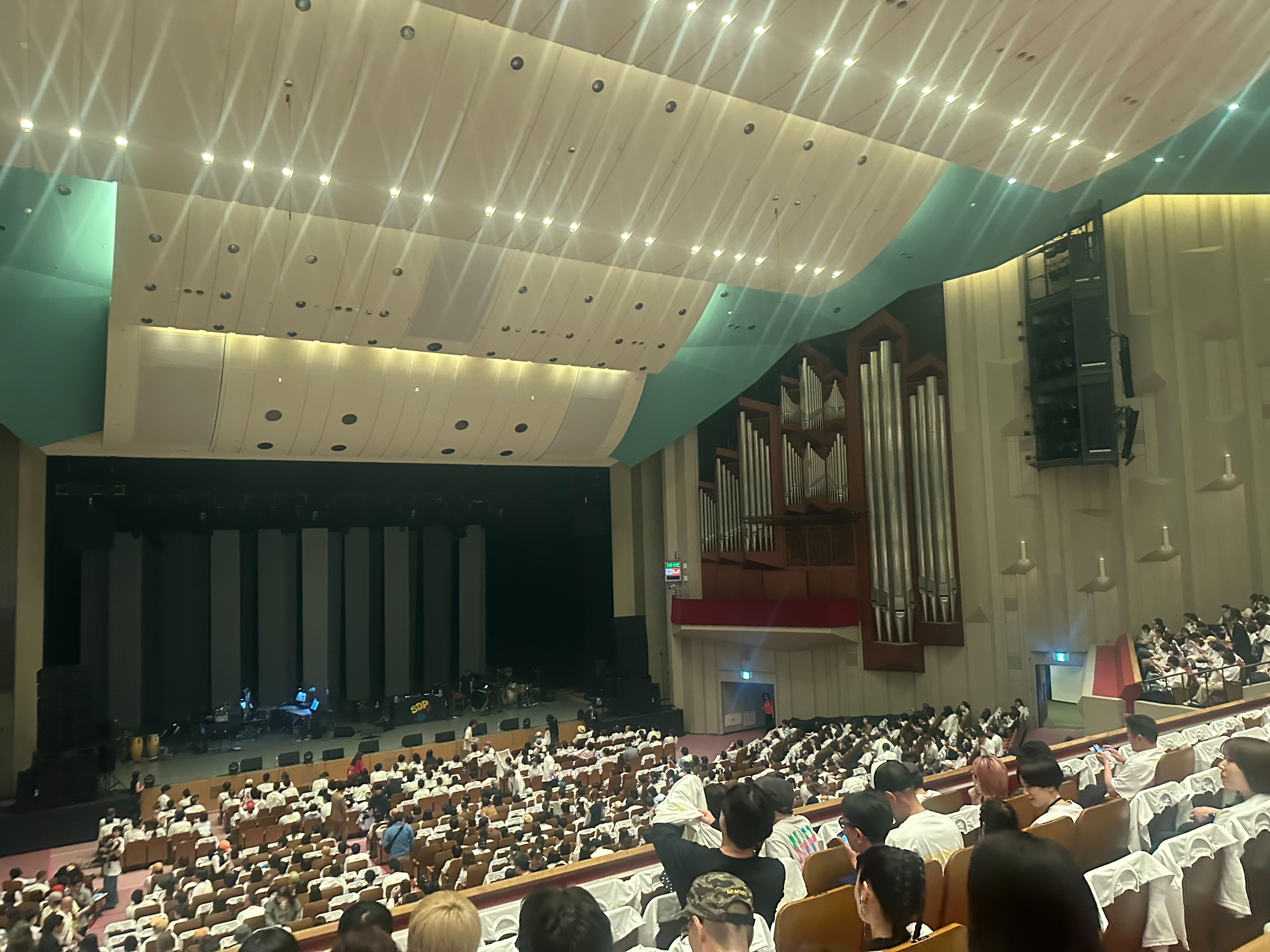
View of the stage

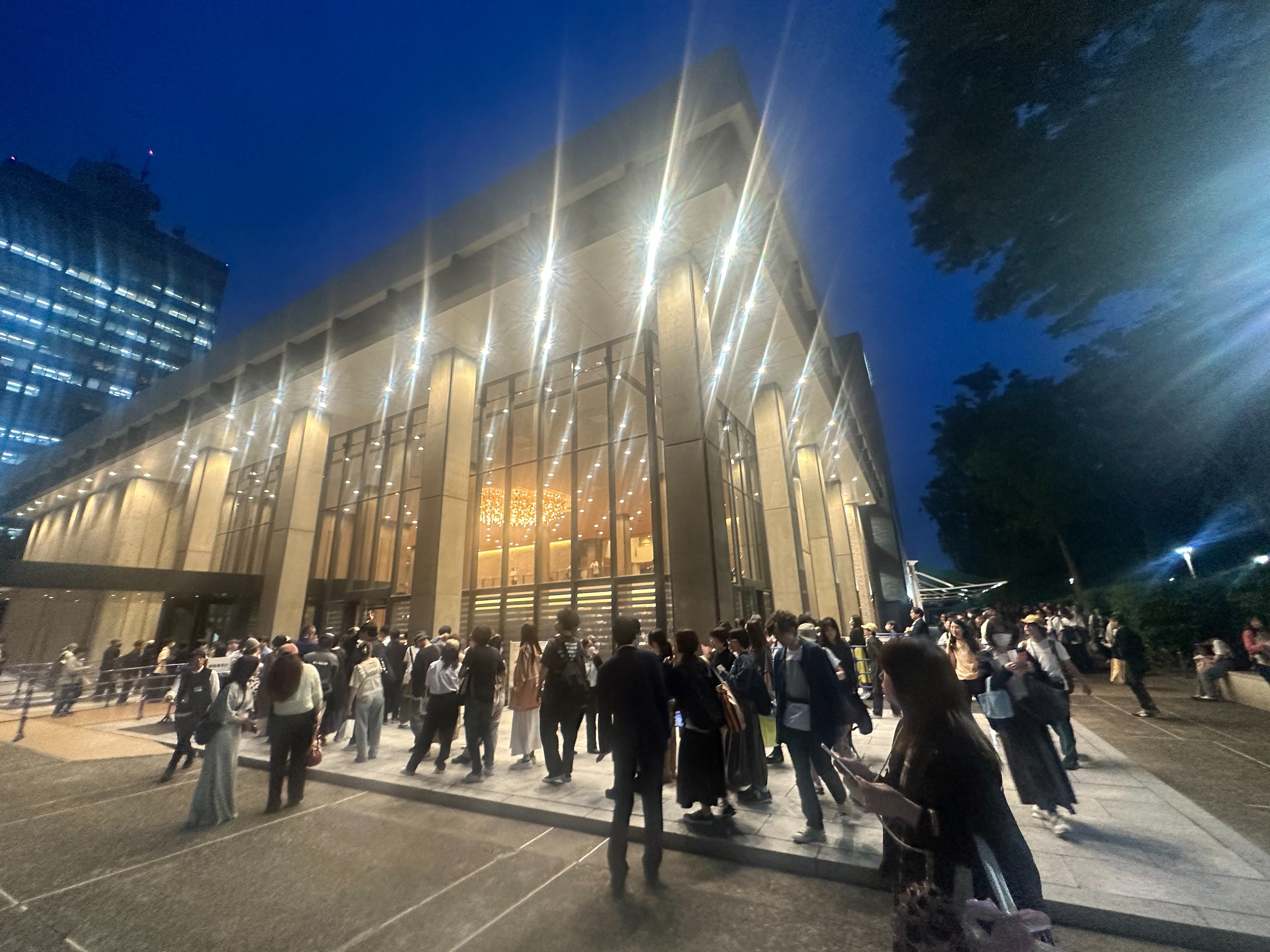
NHK Hall at night

== See also ==
- NHK Osaka Hall

Preceded by Tokyo Takarazuka Theater	Host of the Kōhaku Uta Gassen; 1973–2020	Succeeded by Tokyo International Forum
Preceded by Tokyo International Forum	Host of the Kōhaku Uta Gassen; 2022–present	Succeeded by current
