= Kaori Mizumori =

Japanese singer

Kaori Mizumori (水森かおり, Mizumori Kaori) (born 31 August 1973) is a Japanese enka singer with Tokuma Japan Communications. Her real name is Yukiko Ōde (大出弓紀子). She started her enka singing career in 1995.

Her songs are usually titled after Japanese landmarks and Japanese nature, which are widely accepted and well received, making Mizumori extremely popular and receiving many invitations to be the ambassador of many regions in Japan.

Unlike her enka singing peers, Mizumori usually performs in Western dresses, instead of the traditional kimono. Currently she holds the record of having the most top ten singles for a female enka singer. All her singles have entered the top 10 Oricon Chart since 2004.

Mizumori is also a regular at the annual NHK Red and White Song Festival, with New Year's Eve of 2017 marking her 15th appearance since her first in 2003.

== Discography ==
- Lonely Satsuma Road (ひとり薩摩路, Hitori Satsumaji)
- Kumano Kodō (熊野古道)
- Gonō Line (五能線, Gonōsen)
- Kushiro Wetlands (釧路湿原, Kushiro Shitsugen)
- Tottori Sand Dunes (鳥取砂丘, Tottori Sakyū)
- Cherry Guard (櫻守, Sakuramori)
- Flower of Transience (かりそめの花, Karisome no Hana)
- Four O'Clock Flower (おしろい花, Oshiroibana)
- Tappi Cape (竜飛岬, Tappi Misaki)
