= Fuyumi Sakamoto =

Fuyumi Sakamoto 坂本 冬美
- Born: March 30, 1967 (age 59)
- Origin: Kamitonda, Nishimuro District, Wakayama Prefecture, Japan
- Genres: Enka, rock
- Occupation: Singer
- Years active: 1987–present
- Label: EMI Music Japan
- Website: www.fuyumi-fc.com

Fuyumi Sakamoto (坂本 冬美, Sakamoto Fuyumi; born March 30, 1967, in Kamitonda, Nishimuro District, Wakayama Prefecture, Japan) is a Japanese female enka singer under EMI Music Japan.

== Career ==
Having won a singing contest in early 1986, and after receiving about 11 months of vocal training, Sakamoto debuted as an enka recording singer with the single "Abare Daiko" in March 1987, and was well received. In 1988, she took part in the 39th NHK Kōhaku Uta Gassen (New Year's Eve "song battle") for the first time. As of 2017, she has taken part 29 times, missing only the 53rd (2002) edition due to illness. This achievement placed Sakamoto on the 5th place (tied with another enka veteran Harumi Miyako) for the most Kōhaku appearances for a female artist.

Sakamoto was also a vocalist of rock band HIS (ja) with bassist and producer Haruomi Hosono and guitarist Kiyoshiro Imawano, though Imawano died in 2009. The band's name is an acronym coming from their names Hosono, Imawano and Sakamoto. The band released their album Nippon no Hito (日本の人, Japanese People) on July 19, 1991.

In the 1993 Kōhaku Uta Gassen, she played Sailor Mercury with Hiroko Moriguchi as Sailor Moon and Hikaru Nishida as Sailor Mars. "Yozakura Oshichi" (1994) is one of her most famous songs. Although her songs are not usually popular with young people, this was the exception.

On January 7, 2009, Sakamoto released the double A-side single "Asia no Kaizoku/Mata Kimi ni Koi Shiteru" (アジアの海賊／また君に恋してる, Ajia no Kaizoku/Mata Kimi ni Koi Shiteru; "Asian Pirates/I'm Falling in Love With You Again"). The single debuted at No. 13 on the Japanese Oricon weekly charts. "Mata Kimi ni Koi Shiteru" was her cover version of Billy BanBan's song. The double A-side single "Asia no Kaizoku/Mata Kimi ni Koi Shiteru" eventually peaked at number three on the Oricon Weekly Charts, becoming her biggest hit in Japan.

The song "Mata Kimi ni Koishiteru" (また君に恋してる, I'm Falling in Love with You Again) rose to the number-one spot on the RIAJ Digital Track Chart between March 31 and April 6, 2010. On July 13, 2010, Sakamoto's album Love Songs: Mata Kimi ni Koishiteru (Love Songs〜また君に恋してる〜, Love Songs: I'm Falling in Love with You Again) has sold a total of 202,000 copies since its release in October 2009, making her the first female enka singer to have an album reach 200,000 in sales since Teresa Teng in 1989.

On September 14, 2011, "Okaeri ga Omamori (Welcome back is my charm) "the song about her love for Wakayama (her home town) was released.

== Awards and nominations ==
=== Japan Record Awards ===
The Japan Record Awards is a major music awards show held annually in Japan by the Japan Composer's Association.

Year	Nominee / work	Award	Result
2011	Fuyumi Sakamoto	Best Singer Award	Won

== Filmography ==
- Belle (2021), Okumoto (voice)
