= Hiroshi Itsuki =

Japanese singer and composer (born 1948)

Itsuki Hiroshi 五木ひろし
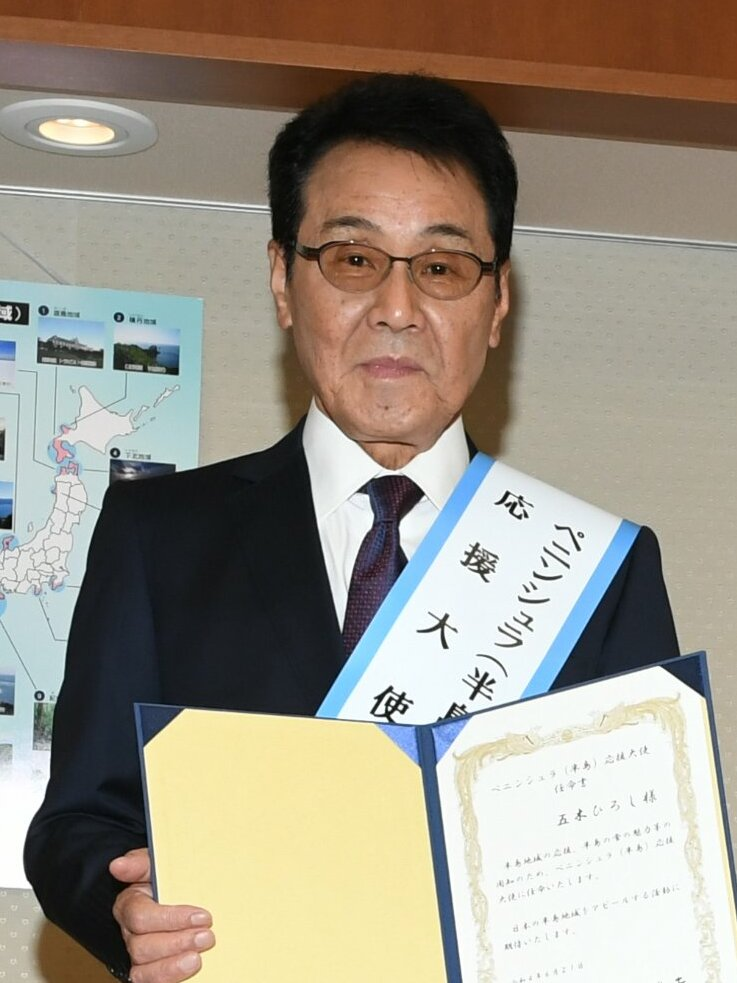
- 2022

Background information
- Also known as: Masaru Matsuyama (1965-1967); Eiichi Ichijō (1967-1968); Ken Mitani (1969-1971)
- Born: Kazuo Matsuyama; March 14, 1948 (age 78); Fukui Prefecture, Japan
- Genres: Enka, Pop
- Occupations: Singer, Composer
- Years active: 1965–Present
- Label: Tokuma Japan Communications
- Website: www.itsuki-hiroshi.co.jp

Hiroshi Itsuki (五木ひろし, Itsuki Hiroshi; born March 14, 1948) is a Japanese singer and composer. As of 1987, he had sold 20 million singles and 4 million LP albums.

Itsuki is usually regarded as an enka singer, but he has also released a cover version of Southern All Stars' J-pop song "Tsunami".

== Career ==
In 1965, Itsuki debuted under the stage name "Masaru Matsuyama," but did not initially achieve commercial success. Although he changed his stage name to "Eiichi Ichijō" in 1967, and then to "Ken Mitani" in 1969, there was no improvement in his music's commercial sales. In 1971, he changed his name to "Hiroshi Itsuki" and was given the song "Yokohama Tasogare" (よこはま・たそがれ) by Masaaki Hirao. Written by lyricist Yoko Yamaguchi, "Yokohama Tasogare" reached the top of the Oricon weekly single chart.

His 2006 single "Takasebune" debuted at number 9 on the Oricon charts, becoming his first Top 10 single in 22 years, since his 1984 single "Nagaragawa Enka". In 2008, he was featured in Morning Musume's Cover You album. He sang "Izakaya" with Ai Takahashi. Also in 2008, he collaborated with the girl group Cute, letting them record the song "Edo no Temari Uta", which he himself was planning to include in his end-of-year album. Cute's producer Tsunku liked the song and thought that if performed by girls the enka lyrics will sound like "a modern fairytale". In what was called a collaboration by Tsunku and a rivalry between two performers by Sankei Sports, they both released the song as CD singles, Cute on July 30, and Itsuki as his 132nd single on October 22. Cute's version, entitled "Edo no Temari Uta II", was nominated for the main Japan Record Award of 2008, which also meant receiving a Gold Award from the Japan Composer's Association.

== Discography ==
=== Top 10 singles ===
#	Title	Date/Position
1	Yokohama Tasogare (よこはま・たそがれ Yokohama Twilight); Debut single	1971 (#1)
2	Nagasaki kara fune ni notte (長崎から船に乗って Riding on a boat from Nagasaki)	1971 (#4)
3	Matteiru Onna (待っている女 Woman waiting)	1972 (#6)
4	Anata no Tomoshibi (あなたの灯 Your lamp)	1972 (#5)
5	Yozora (夜空 Night sky)	1973 (#4)
6	Hamahirugao (浜昼顔 Seashore false bindweed)	1974 (#5)
7	Miren (みれん Lingering affection)	1974 (#6)
8	Airenki (哀恋記 Chronicle of a sad love)	1975(#10)
9	Chikumagawa (千曲川 Chikuma River)	1975 (#6)
10	Ai no shihatsu (愛の始発 Love's first train)	1976 (#10)
11	Omae to futari (おまえとふたり A couple with you)	1979 (#3)
12	Shiawase sagashite (倖せさがして Looking for happiness)	1980 (#4)
13	Futari no yoake (ふたりの夜明け Our dawn)	1980 (#10)
14	Sasameyuki (細雪 Light snowfall)	1983 (#9)
15	Nagaragawa enka (長良川艶歌 Enka of the Nagara river)	1984 (#10)
16	Takasebune (高瀬舟 Flatboat)	2006 (#9)

== Honours ==
Japan Record Awards

- Grand Prize: 2 times
- Best Singing Award: 3 times
- Singing Award: 5 times
- Gold award: 10 times
- Composition Award: 1 time
- Best Album Award: 1 time
- Planning Award: 2 times
- Special prize: 2 times
- Masao Koga Memorial Award: Once
- Misora Hibari Memorial Award: Once

Other awards

- Medal with Purple Ribbon (2007)
- Order of the Rising Sun, 4th Class, Gold Rays with Rosette (2018)
