= 1962 European Athletics Championships – Women's javelin throw =

Women's javelin throw at the European Athletics Championships

The women's javelin throw at the 1962 European Athletics Championships was held in Belgrade, then Yugoslavia, at JNA Stadium on 13 and 14 September 1962.

== Medalists ==
Gold	Elvīra Ozoliņa; Soviet Union
Silver	Maria Diaconescu; Romania
Bronze	Alevtina Shastitko; Soviet Union

== Results ==
=== Final ===
14 September

Rank	Name	Nationality	Result	Notes
1st place, gold medalist(s)	Elvīra Ozoliņa	Soviet Union	54.93	
2nd place, silver medalist(s)	Maria Diaconescu	Romania	52.10	
3rd place, bronze medalist(s)	Alevtina Shastitko	Soviet Union	51.80	
4	Anneliese Gerhards	West Germany	50.92	
5	Márta Antál	Hungary	49.91	
6	Erika Strasser	Austria	49.90	
7	Inge Schwalbe	East Germany	48.55	
8	Yelena Gorchakova	Soviet Union	46.74	
9	Marijeta Kacic	Yugoslavia	46.29	
10	Marion Gräfe	East Germany	46.28	
11	Margarita Baltakova	Bulgaria	44.58	
12	Sirpa Toivola	Finland	44.56	

=== Qualification ===
13 September

Rank	Name	Nationality	Result	Notes
1	Elvīra Ozoliņa	Soviet Union	51.60	Q
2	Anneliese Gerhards	West Germany	51.15	Q
3	Maria Diaconescu	Romania	50.93	Q
4	Alevtina Shastitko	Soviet Union	50.55	Q
5	Márta Antál	Hungary	50.50	Q
6	Inge Schwalbe	East Germany	49.96	Q
7	Marion Gräfe	East Germany	49.22	Q
8	Erika Strasser	Austria	47.68	Q
9	Yelena Gorchakova	Soviet Union	47.48	Q
10	Marijeta Kacic	Yugoslavia	46.63	Q
11	Sirpa Toivola	Finland	46.45	Q
12	Margarita Baltakova	Bulgaria	45.17	Q
13	Vlasta Hrbková	Czechoslovakia	44.28	
14	Sue Platt	Great Britain	44.17	

== Participation ==
According to an unofficial count, 14 athletes from 11 countries participated in the event.

- Austria (1)
- Bulgaria (1)
- Czechoslovakia (1)
- East Germany (2)
- Finland (1)
- Hungary (1)
- Romania (1)
- Soviet Union (3)
- Great Britain (1)
- West Germany (1)
- Yugoslavia (1)
