= 1954 European Athletics Championships – Women's javelin throw =

Women's javelin throw at the European Athletics Championships

The women's javelin throw at the 1954 European Athletics Championships was held in Bern, Switzerland, at Stadion Neufeld on 25 August 1954.

== Medalists ==
Gold	Dana Zátopková; Czechoslovakia
Silver	Virve Roolaid; Soviet Union
Bronze	Nadezhda Konyayeva; Soviet Union

== Results ==
=== Final ===
25 August

Rank	Name	Nationality	Result	Notes
1st place, gold medalist(s)	Dana Zátopková	Czechoslovakia	52.91	CR
2nd place, silver medalist(s)	Virve Roolaid	Soviet Union	49.94	
3rd place, bronze medalist(s)	Nadezhda Konyayeva	Soviet Union	49.49	
4	Jutta Neumann	West Germany	47.39	
5	Aleksandra Chudina	Soviet Union	47.05	
6	Cmiljka Kalušević	Yugoslavia	46.78	
7	Jadwiga Majka	Poland	44.80	
8	Erzsébet Vígh	Hungary	43.74	
9	Almut Brömmel	West Germany	42.39	
10	Ingrid Almqvist	Sweden	41.95	
11	Betta Gross	West Germany	41.47	
12	Anneliese Reimesch	Romania	41.36	
13	Lily Kelsby	Denmark	40.78	
14	Marlies Schwärzler	Austria	35.28	

== Participation ==
According to an unofficial count, 14 athletes from 10 countries participated in the event.

- Austria (1)
- Czechoslovakia (1)
- Denmark (1)
- Hungary (1)
- Poland (1)
- Romania (1)
- Soviet Union (3)
- Sweden (1)
- West Germany (3)
- Yugoslavia (1)
