= Athletics at the 1959 Summer Universiade – Women's javelin throw =

The women's javelin throw event at the 1959 Summer Universiade was held at the Stadio Comunale di Torino in Turin on 5 September 1959.

== Results ==
Rank	Name	Nationality	Result	Notes
1st place, gold medalist(s)	Elvīra Ozoliņa	Soviet Union	49.95	
2nd place, silver medalist(s)	Urszula Figwer	Poland	47.02	
3rd place, bronze medalist(s)	Maria Diţi	Romania	46.86	
4	Anikó Balogh	Hungary	46.24	
5	Hannelore Wohlrab	West Germany	44.78	
6	Katalin Pitrolffy	Hungary	43.50	
7	Yoriko Shida	Japan	42.98	
8	Beate Rosenthal	West Germany	42.60	
