= Athletics at the 1956 Summer Olympics – Women's javelin throw =

Video on YouTube Official Video @1:04:05

The women's javelin throw was an event at the 1956 Summer Olympics in Melbourne, Australia. The qualifying round mark was set at 43.00m. Five athletes didn't surpass that distance in the heats.

== Summary ==
Nadezhda Konyayeva entered as the world record holder, having set the record almost 3 years earlier. Dana Zátopková was the returning champion. The leading qualifier was 18 year old Karen Anderson, throwing 49.64m on her first attempt. But she was unable to match that in the final. On her first throw of the final, Inese Jaunzeme set the Olympic record with a 51.63m throw. Ingrid Almqvist moved into second with a 49.74m while Konyayeva was third. With a 50.28m in the second round, Konyayeva moved into second place, with Zátopková moving into third. The medal positions held until the fifth round when Marlene Ahrens threw 50.38m to leap from fifth place to silver. On her final attempt for punctuation, Jaunzeme added more than two meters, almost seven feet to the Olympic record, throwing 53.86 m (176 ft 8 in). Ahrens was the first Olympic medal for a Chilean woman.

== Medalists ==
Gold	Inese Jaunzeme (URS)
Silver	Marlene Ahrens (CHI)
Bronze	Nadezhda Konyayeva (URS)

== Results ==
=== Qualification ===
Qualifying distance: 43.00 metres

Rank	Athlete	Nation	1	2	3	Distance	Notes
1	Karen Anderson	United States	49.64			49.64	Q
2	Urszula Figwer	Poland	47.76			47.76	Q
3	Nadezhda Konyayeva	Soviet Union	47.19			47.19	Q
4	Dana Zátopková	Czechoslovakia	47.05			47.05	Q
5	Marlene Ahrens	Chile	46.43			46.43	Q
6	Inese Jaunzeme	Soviet Union	46.19			46.19	Q
7	Marjorie Larney	United States	39.04	36.89	45.80	45.80	Q
8	Yoriko Shida	Japan	38.50	45.37		45.37	Q
9	Erzsébet Vígh	Hungary	44.60			44.60	Q
10	Almut Brömmel	United Team of Germany	44.55			44.55	Q
11	Amelia Wershoven	United States	44.39			44.39	Q
12	Anna Wojtaszek	Poland	44.08			44.08	Q
14	Ingrid Almqvist	Sweden	43.47			43.47	Q
15	Paola Paternoster	Italy	39.69	42.68	41.25	42.68	
16	Margaret George	Canada	33.56	36.62	39.73	39.73	
17	Maureen Wright	Australia	36.75	38.81	36.91	38.81	
18	Heather Innes	Australia	38.72	35.57	x	38.72	
19	June Heath	Australia	35.76	38.10	x	38.10	

=== Final ===
Rank	Athlete	Nation	1	2	3	4	5	6	Distance	Notes
1st place, gold medalist(s)	Inese Jaunzeme	Soviet Union	51.63	46.62	50.46	53.40	49.08	53.86	53.86	OR
2nd place, silver medalist(s)	Marlene Ahrens	Chile	47.47	49.36	44.68	46.30	50.38	39.31	50.38	
3rd place, bronze medalist(s)	Nadezhda Konyayeva	Soviet Union	49.48	50.28	46.24	47.39	44.51	44.40	50.28	
4	Dana Zátopková	Czechoslovakia	43.52	49.83	47.07	47.59	49.81	41.59	49.83	
5	Ingrid Almqvist	Sweden	49.74	43.58	45.06	48.24	43.06	41.17	49.74	
6	Urszula Figwer	Poland	44.28	48.16	42.54	42.81	43.02	45.64	48.16	
7	Erzsébet Vígh	Hungary	46.69	48.07	47.38				48.07	
8	Karen Anderson	United States	47.28	48.00	41.76				48.00	
9	Anna Wojtaszek	Poland	46.92	46.27	45.36				46.92	
10	Erika Raue	United Team of Germany	43.27	x	45.87				45.87	
11	Marjorie Larney	United States	41.44	45.27	42.09				45.27	
12	Yoriko Shida	Japan	44.96	43.34	37.20				44.96	
13	Almut Brömmel	United Team of Germany	40.72	42.37	44.67				44.67	
14	Amelia Wershoven	United States	44.29	40.45	32.59				44.29	
