= Athletics at the 1960 Summer Olympics – Women's javelin throw =

Women's javelin throw at the Games of the XVII Olympiad
- Venue: Olympic Stadium
- Dates: September 1, 1960
- Competitors: 20 from 14 nations
- Winning distance: 55.98 OR

Medalists
1st place, gold medalist(s)		Elvīra Ozoliņa; Soviet Union
2nd place, silver medalist(s)		Dana Zátopková; Czechoslovakia
3rd place, bronze medalist(s)		Birutė Kalėdienė; Soviet Union

The women's javelin throw throwing event at the 1960 Olympic Games took place on September 1.

== Results ==
Top 12 throwers and ties plus all throwers reaching 48.00 metres advanced to the finals. All distances are listed in metres.

=== Qualifying ===
Rank	Name	Nationality	Mark	1	2	3
1	Elvīra Ozoliņa	Soviet Union	53.25	53.25	pass	pass
2	Dana Zátopková	Czechoslovakia	51.64	47.94	51.64	pass
3	Sue Platt	Great Britain	50.67	50.67	pass	pass
4	Karen Anderson	United States	50.62	43.96	44.26	50.62
5	Vlasta Pešková	Czechoslovakia	50.61	50.61	pass	pass
6	Márta Rudasné Antal	Hungary	50.01	foul	47.56	50.01
7	Maria Diţi	Romania	49.80	49.80	pass	pass
8	Anna Wojtaszek	Australia	49.20	45.66	49.20	pass
9	Alevtina Shastitko	Soviet Union	48.91	48.91	pass	pass
10	Birutė Kalėdienė	Soviet Union	48.59	48.59	pass	pass
11	Marlene Ahrens	Chile	48.36	44.61	48.36	pass
12	Anneliese Gerhards	United Team of Germany	48.33	45.89	foul	48.33
13	Urszula Figwer	Poland	48.04	48.04	pass	pass
14	Ingrid Almqvist	Sweden	47.67	foul	44.33	47.67
15	Erika Strößenreuther	United Team of Germany	46.85	45.88	foul	46.85
16	Almut Brömmel	United Team of Germany	45.52	34.76	45.52	41.20
17	Erika Strasser	Austria	43.80	43.79	43.80	foul
18	Lise Koch	Denmark	43.01	43.01	foul	40.36
19	Averil Williams	Great Britain	42.44	42.44	foul	40.03
20	Unn Thorvaldsen	Norway	41.99	foul	foul	41.99
	Elizabeth Davenport	India	DNS			

=== Final ===
Rank	Name	Nationality	Mark	1	2	3	4	5	6	Notes
1st place, gold medalist(s)	Elvīra Ozoliņa	Soviet Union	55.98	55.98 OR	foul	51.54	54.80	foul	foul	OR
2nd place, silver medalist(s)	Dana Zátopková	Czechoslovakia	53.78	49.84	50.36	53.78	51.02	46.13	50.70	
3rd place, bronze medalist(s)	Birutė Kalėdienė	Soviet Union	53.45	50.17	49.81	53.45	50.87	49.58	foul	
4	Vlasta Pešková	Czechoslovakia	52.56	50.94	foul	51.28	52.56	49.00	48.82	
5	Urszula Figwer	Poland	52.33	52.33	foul	47.92	50.16	46.53	pass	
6	Anna Wojtaszek	Australia	51.15	51.15	47.04	foul	42.76	47.35	foul	
7	Sue Platt	Great Britain	51.01	51.01	50.84	foul				
8	Alevtina Shastitko	Soviet Union	50.92	47.43	50.83	50.92				
9	Márta Rudasné Antal	Hungary	50.25	50.25	48.41	49.66				
10	Maria Diţi	Romania	49.56	49.56	47.49	48.83				
11	Anneliese Gerhards	United Team of Germany	49.27	47.76	49.27	foul				
12	Marlene Ahrens	Chile	47.53	46.39	47.53	45.34				
13	Karen Anderson	United States	46.52	44.39	46.52	44.24				

Key: OR = Olympic record
