= Maria Diaconescu =

Romanian javelin thrower

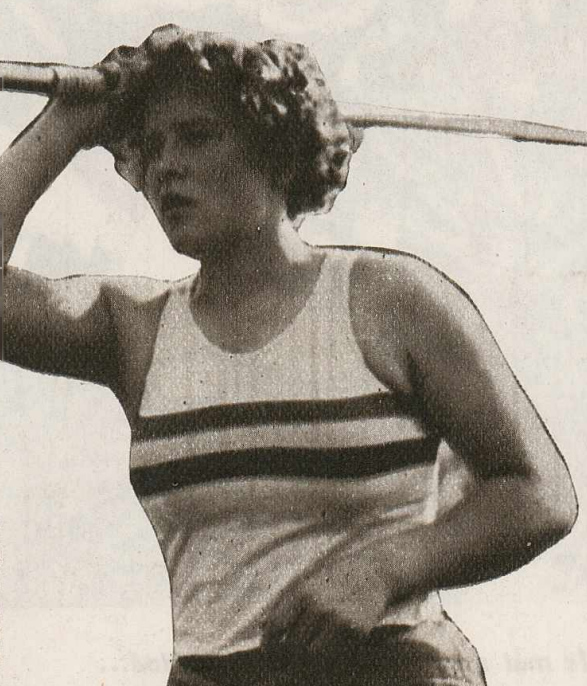
- Maria Diți 1957

Personal information
- Nationality: Romania
- Born: November 16, 1937 Câmpulung Moldovenesc, Romania
- Height: 1.68 m (5 ft 6 in)
- Weight: 68 kg (150 lb)

Achievements and titles
- Personal best: Javelin: 56.64 (1961)
Medal record
Women's athletics
Representing Romania
European Championships
Silver medal – second place	1962 Belgrade	Javelin throw
Universiade
Silver medal – second place	1961 Sofia	Javelin throw
Bronze medal – third place	1959 Turin	Javelin throw

Maria Diaconescu (née Diți; born 16 November 1937) is a Romanian former javelin thrower. She won the silver medal in women's javelin throw at the 1962 European Athletics Championships, competed in the Summer Olympics twice, and was ranked in the world's top ten five times between 1957 and 1964.

== Career ==
Diaconescu won her first international medals in 1957, winning gold at the Balkan Games in Athens with a throw of 52.14 m and placing second behind Inese Jaunzeme at the UIE World Student Games in Moscow with 50.06 m. Jan Popper, a Czechoslovak sports statistician, ranked her second in the world that year, behind only Dana Zátopková and ahead of the previous year's number one, Jaunzeme. In 1958 Diaconescu placed seventh at the European Championships, but was not ranked in the world's top ten. In 1959 she placed third behind Elvīra Ozoliņa and Urszula Figwer at the first Summer Universiade in Turin. She competed in the 1960 Summer Olympics in Rome, qualifying for the final but only placing tenth.

In 1961 Diaconescu was ranked fourth in the world, her second top 10 ranking, after she placed second behind Yelena Gorchakova at the second Summer Universiade with a throw of 50.64 m and threw 56.64 m, her personal best, in Sofia on July 15. In 1962 she placed second to Ozoliņa at both the European Championships in Belgrade and the UIE World Student Games in Helsinki and was again world-ranked second. She remained in the world's top ten in 1963 and 1964; at the 1964 Summer Olympics she threw 53.71 m and placed sixth.
