= 1958 European Athletics Championships – Women's javelin throw =

Women's javelin throw at the European Athletics Championships

The women's javelin throw at the 1958 European Athletics Championships was held in Stockholm, Sweden, at Stockholms Olympiastadion on 19 August 1958.

== Medalists ==
| Gold | Dana Zátopková; Czechoslovakia |
| Silver | Birutė Zalogaitytė; Soviet Union |
| Bronze | Jutta Neumann; West Germany |

== Results ==
=== Final ===
19 August

| Rank | Name | Nationality | Result | Notes |
|---|---|---|---|---|
| 1st place, gold medalist(s) | Dana Zátopková | Czechoslovakia | 56.02 | AR |
| 2nd place, silver medalist(s) | Birutė Zalogaitytė | Soviet Union | 51.30 | |
| 3rd place, bronze medalist(s) | Jutta Neumann | West Germany | 50.50 | |
| 4 | Eleonora Bogun | Soviet Union | 49.88 | |
| 5 | Maria Grabowska | Poland | 49.77 | |
| 6 | Urszula Figwer | Poland | 49.48 | |
| 7 | Maria Diţi | Romania | 49.03 | |
| 8 | Almut Brömmel | West Germany | 48.85 | |
| 9 | Ingrid Almqvist | Sweden | 46.90 | |
| 10 | Liselotte Kipp | West Germany | 46.89 | |
| 11 | Tamara Tsvetkova | Soviet Union | 45.52 | |
| 12 | Cmiljka Kalušević | Yugoslavia | 45.42 | |
| 13 | Irena Starzyńska | Poland | 45.10 | |
| 14 | Averil Williams | Great Britain | 44.04 | |

=== Qualification ===
19 August

| Rank | Name | Nationality | Result | Notes |
|---|---|---|---|---|
| 1 | Almut Brömmel | West Germany | 49.96 | Q |
| 2 | Ingrid Almqvist | Sweden | 49.49 | Q |
| 3 | Dana Zátopková | Czechoslovakia | 49.29 | Q |
| 4 | Birutė Zalogaitytė | Soviet Union | 49.14 | Q |
| 5 | Urszula Figwer | Poland | 47.55 | Q |
| 6 | Jutta Neumann | West Germany | 47.02 | Q |
| 7 | Eleonora Bogun | Soviet Union | 46.95 | Q |
| 8 | Liselotte Kipp | West Germany | 46.85 | Q |
| 9 | Maria Grabowska | Poland | 46.68 | Q |
| 10 | Irena Starzyńska | Poland | 45.11 | Q |
| 11 | Tamara Tsvetkova | Soviet Union | 44.35 | Q |
| 12 | Averil Williams | Great Britain | 43.96 | Q |
| 13 | Maria Diţi | Romania | 43.86 | Q |
| 14 | Cmiljka Kalušević | Yugoslavia | 43.10 | Q |
| 15 | Lise Kock | Denmark | 41.60 | |
| 16 | Unn Thorvaldsen | Norway | 39.28 | |

== Participation ==
According to an unofficial count, 16 athletes from 10 countries participated in the event.

- Czechoslovakia (1)
- Denmark (1)
- Norway (1)
- Poland (3)
- Romania (1)
- Soviet Union (3)
- Sweden (1)
- Great Britain (1)
- West Germany (3)
- Yugoslavia (1)
