= Athletics at the 1948 Summer Olympics – Women's javelin throw =

Women's javelin throw at the Games of the XIV Olympiad
- Dates: July 31, 1948 (final)
- Competitors: 15 from 10 nations
- Winning distance: 45.57 OR

Medalists
1st place, gold medalist(s)		Herma Bauma; Austria
2nd place, silver medalist(s)		Kaisa Parviainen; Finland
3rd place, bronze medalist(s)		Lily Carlstedt; Denmark

Video on YouTube Official Video @ 17:00

The women's javelin throw event was part of the track and field athletics programme at the 1948 Summer Olympics. The competition was held on July 31, 1948. The final was won by Herma Bauma of Austria.

== Records ==
Prior to the competition, the existing World and Olympic records were as follows.

World record	Anneliese Steinheuer (GER)	47.24 m	Frankfurt, Germany	21 June 1942
Olympic record	Tilly Fleischer (GER)	45.18 m	Berlin, Germany	2 August 1936

The following new Olympic record was set during this competition:

Date	Event	Athlete	Distance	Notes
31 July	Final	Herma Bauma (AUT)	45.57	OR

== Schedule ==
All times are British Summer Time (UTC+1)

Date	Time	Round
Saturday, 31 July 1948	14:30	Finals

== Results ==
=== Final standings ===
Rank	Name	Nationality	Distance	Notes
1st place, gold medalist(s)	Herma Bauma	Austria	45.57	OR
2nd place, silver medalist(s)	Kaisa Parviainen	Finland	43.79	
3rd place, bronze medalist(s)	Lily Carlstedt	Denmark	42.08	
4	Dorothy Dodson	United States	41.96	
5	Jo Teunissen-Waalboer	Netherlands	40.92	
6	Ans Koning	Netherlands	40.33	
7	Dana Ingrová-Zátopková	Czechoslovakia	39.94	
8	Elly Dammers	Netherlands	38.23	
9	Gerda Schilling-Staniek	Austria	38.01	
10	Ingrid Almqvist	Sweden	37.26	
11	Melania Sinoracka	Poland	35.74	
12	Theresa Manuel	United States	33.82	
13	Nicole Saeys	Belgium	31.77	
14	Kay Long	Great Britain	30.29	
15	Gladys Clarke	Great Britain	29.59	
	Ine Schäffer	Austria	DNS	
	Ingeborg Mello	Argentina	DNS	

Key: OR = Olympic record
