= Athletics at the 1964 Summer Olympics – Women's javelin throw =

Women's javelin throw at the Games of the XVIII Olympiad
- Venue: Olympic Stadium
- Date: 16 October 1964
- Competitors: 16 from 10 nations
- Winning distance: 60.54

Medalists
1st place, gold medalist(s)		Mihaela Peneș; Romania
2nd place, silver medalist(s)		Antal Marta Rudas; Hungary
3rd place, bronze medalist(s)		Yelena Gorchakova; Soviet Union

The Women's Javelin Throw was one of three women's throwing events on the Athletics at the 1964 Summer Olympics program in Tokyo. It was held on 16 October 1964. 16 athletes from 10 nations entered.

== Results ==
=== Qualification ===
The qualification standard was 51.00 metres. Each thrower had three attempts to reach that standard. Since only 7 throwers made the mark, the next five furthest-throwing athletes also advanced to meet the minimum 12 in the final.

Gorchakova set a new world record, besting the old one by more than 2.5 metres. Ozolina also had a good round, besting the old Olympic record to come in second in qualification.

Place	Athlete	Nation	Best mark	Throw 1	Throw 2	Throw 3
1	Yelena Gorchakova	Soviet Union	62.40 WR	62.40	—	
2	Elvīra Ozoliņa	Soviet Union	56.38	56.38	—	
3	Antal Marta Rudas	Hungary	52.23	52.23	—	
4	Anneliese Gerhards	United Team of Germany	52.23	49.88	49.71	52.23
5	Rosemarie Schubert	United Team of Germany	51.20	X	51.20	—
6	Mihaela Peneș	Romania	51.19	43.00	X	51.19
7	Maria Diaconescu	Romania	51.12	51.12	—	
8	Biruta Kaledene	Soviet Union	50.84	49.70	50.84	48.87
9	Hiroko Sato	Japan	49.92	X	49.92	X
10	Sue Platt	Great Britain	49.88	X	49.88	48.72
11	Misako Katayama	Japan	49.23	39.80	46.11	49.23
12	Michele Demys	France	48.94	48.94	48.67	X
13	RaNae Bair	United States	46.89	46.70	46.89	46.04
14	Ingeborg Schwalbe	United Team of Germany	45.55	45.55	44.41	39.47
15	Anna Pazera	Australia	44.87	41.58	44.87	X
16	Lee Hye-ja	South Korea	34.95	33.24	34.95	29.05

=== Final ===
The qualification marks were ignored for the final, each thrower receiving three new attempts. The top six throwers after those three received three more attempts, taking their best result of the six.

No one came close to equalling Gorchakova's qualifying round throw, her own attempts in the final not coming within 5 metres of it as she dropped to third place.

Place	Athlete	Nation	Best mark	Throw 1	Throw 2	Throw 3	Throw 4	Throw 5	Throw 6
1	Mihaela Peneş	Romania	60.54	60.54	52.76	X	50.72	51.44	53.77
2	Antal Marta Rudas	Hungary	58.27	53.21	58.27	X	54.17	50.24	X
3	Yelena Gorchakova	Soviet Union	57.06	56.43	49.21	53.10	57.06	55.23	X
4	Biruta Kaledene	Soviet Union	56.31	53.79	X	54.13	56.31	54.68	X
5	Elvīra Ozoliņa	Soviet Union	54.81	54.68	54.81	X	X	X	X
6	Maria Diaconescu	Romania	53.71	X	53.71	50.49	51.21	51.35	52.00
7	Hiroko Sato	Japan	52.48	47.28	52.48	49.18			
8	Anneliese Gerhards	United Team of Germany	52.37	52.37	46.79	45.88			
9	Susan Mary Platt	Great Britain	48.59	48.59	48.00	48.55			
10	Michele Demys	France	47.25	45.95	47.14	47.25			
11	Katayama Misako	Japan	46.87	45.16	46.87	42.37			
12	Rosemarie Schubert	United Team of Germany	46.50	X	X	46.50			
