= Kōhaku Uta Gassen =

Japanese New Year's Eve musical television special

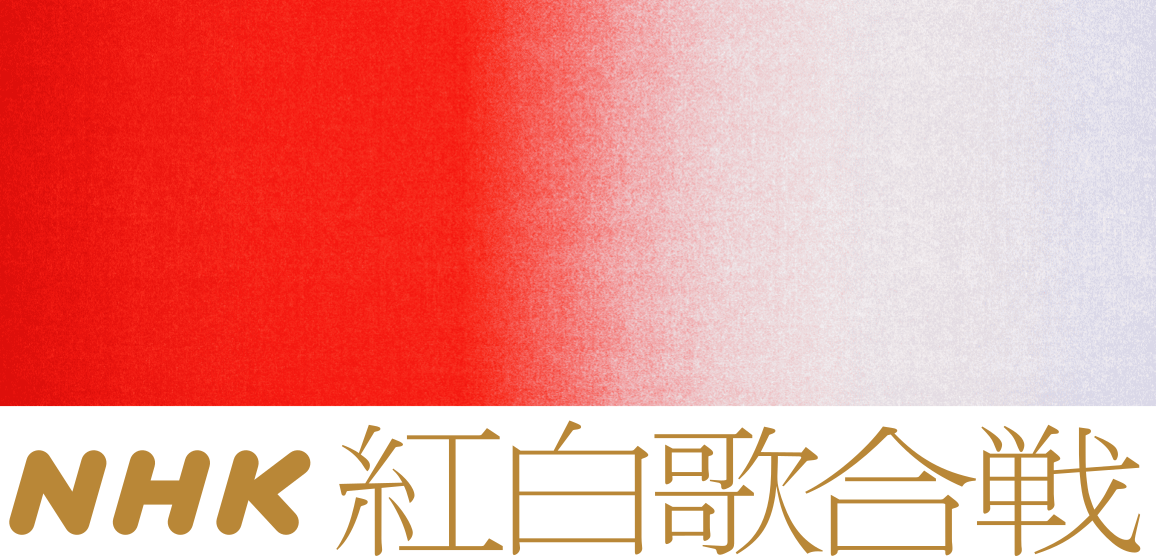
- Also known as: NHK Kōhaku Uta Gassen
- Created by: Tsumoru Kondo
- Ending theme: Hotaru no Hikari
- Country of origin: Japan
- Original language: Japanese
- No. of episodes: 76 contests

Production
- Production locations: Tokyo Takarazuka Theater (1959–1972); NHK Hall (1973–2020; 2022 onwards); Tokyo International Forum (2021)
- Running time: 4 hours 30 minutes
- Production company: NHK

Original release
- Network: NHK General TV (1953–present); NHK AM (1951–present); NHK World Premium (Worldwide) (1998–present)
- Release: January 3, 1951 – present

NHK Kōhaku Uta Gassen (Japanese: NHK紅白歌合戦, Hepburn: Enu Eichi Kei Kōhaku Uta Gassen; "NHK Red and White Song Battle"), more commonly known simply as Kōhaku, is an annual New Year's Eve television special produced by Japanese public broadcaster NHK. It is broadcast live simultaneously on television and radio, nationally and internationally by the NHK network and by some overseas (mainly cable) broadcasters who buy the program. The show ends shortly before midnight. Before the show began broadcasting on television in late 1953, the show was held on 3 January and only consisted of a radio broadcast.

The program divides the most popular music artists of the year into competing teams of red and white. The "red" team or akagumi (赤組, 紅組) is composed of all female artists (or groups with female vocals), while the "white" team or shirogumi (白組) is all male (or groups with male vocals). At the end of the show, judges and the audience vote to decide which group performed better. The honor of performing on Kōhaku is strictly by invitation, so only the most successful singing acts in the Japanese entertainment industry can perform. In addition to the actual music performances, the costumes, hair-styles, makeup, dancing, and lighting are given focus. A performance on the show is regarded as a highlight in singers' careers due to the show's wide reach.

== Song selection process ==
The songs and performers are examined by a selection committee put together by NHK. The basis for selection are record sales and adaptability to the edition's theme.

At the same time, a demographic survey is conducted regarding the most popular singers for each and what kind of music people want to hear. This and the song selection explain the amalgamation of the musical genres and its artists.

There are, however, exceptions to the process. Momoe Yamaguchi chose to sing her favorite song "Hito Natsu no Keiken" (ひと夏の経験) with its suggestive lyrics during the 25th edition, despite NHK's pick of a different song.

== Show ==
When the show was first broadcast on radio in 1951, each team had a few performers, all of whom would perform within an hour. Since 1989, the program goes on for at least four hours as both teams, each having at least 25 performers, perform their songs.

At the end of the show, the audience and a panel of judges—notable celebrities who may or may not have a connection to the music industry—vote to select the winning team. In the past, the audience vote has been composed of a head count of the venue audience members, who could vote for either team (NHK Hall, which has been the venue for most Kōhaku editions since 1971, can seat 3,000 people). This counted as one vote.

As of the 54th (2003) and 55th editions (2004), viewers who watch the program through ISDB-S on NHK BS Hi-vision could vote by having their own head count in their respective households. Although it was still sketchy to determine in the 55th, the audience vote was counted as two votes: one for the venue audience and one for ISDB-S viewers.

The audience vote(s) are added to those of the judges who each have to vote for one team. The team with the most votes wins.

The above process was done differently for the 56th edition (2005). Instead, the NHK Hall head count, the vote count from cellphone users and the vote count from ISDB-S viewers each counted as one vote. As stated above, the team that got at least two votes won.

In the 57th edition (2006), aside from cellphone and ISDB-S viewers and the NHK Hall audience, 1seg users voted. Its format had been reverted to the ball voting system—from the audience head count and the judges' votes.

From the 58th edition (2007) to the 63rd edition (2012) and again in the 65th (2014), 66th (2015), and 68th (2017) through 70th editions (2019), the winner was determined through an overall head count, all from cellphone, ISDB-S viewers, 1seg users, and the NHK Hall Audience (including guests). Voting reverted temporarily to judges plus audience-unit votes in the 64th edition (2013) and 67th (2016) except that viewing audience votes (from internet, cellphone, digital TV, and 1seg voting) during halftime and end of show would each count as one vote and the NHK Hall head count as another single vote. The 71st edition (2020) featured off-venue voting only as there was no live audience in attendance due to concerns that arose from the COVID-19 pandemic in Japan. The 71st edition also saw performances emanating from multiple venues within NHK's studio premises with NHK Hall still the main staging area. The 74th edition (2023) was TV Japan's last broadcast in North America before the network went off the air three months later and would be replaced by the Jme Japanese streaming platform, which aired the 75th edition the following year.

Aside from the performances, there are special performances where certain performers do their act together, the so-called "Ring Show" where performers from both teams take part in a "singing exercise," as well as performances from non-competing artists both in Japan and abroad. At the end of the show, all the performers sing "Hotaru no Hikari" (蛍の光) together. The song is based on the Scottish "Auld Lang Syne" that is commonly sung at New Year parties in the west. In addition, the 50th edition of the show included a "Countdown Special" to welcome the year 2000.

A special celebrating the 100 years of broadcasting aired on March 25, 2025. More than 10,000 submissions were received from the public, who shared their favorite and most memorable moments from all broadcasts. Teruyoshi Uchimura, Yo Oizumi, Mone Kamishiraishi, and announcer Maho Kuwako serve as hosts of the special program "100 Years of Broadcasting Project: Everyone's Best Kohaku", airing on March 25, recorded at NHK Hall, Kohaku's venue since 1973. The cast includes Kiyoshi Hikawa, Hiromi Go, Akira Fuse, AI, Nogizaka46, and Golden Bomber. Kazunari Ninomiya is scheduled for a guest appearance. Performers talk about their "Kohaku" memories and sing songs that meet this theme. Previous to the program, a special Songs aired on March 13, with guests, including Lady Gaga, commenting about their experiences on Kohaku.

== Results ==
| No. | Date | Red team host | White team host | Mediator | Winning team | Overall record |
SHOWA ERA
| 1 | 3 January 1951 | Michiko Katō | Shuuichi Fujikura | Masaharu Tanabe | White | 1–0 |
| 2 | 3 January 1952 | Kiyoko Tange | Shuuichi Fujikura | Masaharu Tanabe | White | 2–0 |
| 3 | 2 January 1953 | Suga Honda | Teru Miyata | Masayori Shimura | White | 3–0 |
| 4 | 31 December 1953 | Takiko Mizunoe | Keizo Takahashi | Seigoro Kitade | Red | 3–1 |
| 5 | 31 December 1954 | Natsue Fukuji | Keizo Takahashi | Shōzaburō Ishii | Red | 3-2 |
| 6 | 31 December 1955 | Teru Miyata | Keizo Takahashi | Shōzaburō Ishii | Red | 3-3 |
| 7 | 31 December 1956 | Teru Miyata | Keizo Takahashi | Shōzaburō Ishii | White | 4–3 |
| 8 | 31 December 1957 | Takiko Mizunoe | Keizo Takahashi | Shōzaburō Ishii | Red | 4-4 |
| 9 | 31 December 1958 | Tetsuko Kuroyanagi | Keizo Takahashi | Shōzaburō Ishii | Red | 4–5 |
| 10 | 31 December 1959 | Meiko Nakamura | Keizo Takahashi | Shōzaburō Ishii | Red | 4–6 |
| 11 | 31 December 1960 | Meiko Nakamura | Keizo Takahashi | Shōzaburō Ishii | White | 5–6 |
| 12 | 31 December 1961 | Meiko Nakamura | Keizo Takahashi | Toshiaki Hosaka | White | 6-6 |
| 13 | 31 December 1962 | Mitsuko Mori | Teru Miyata | Shōzaburō Ishii | White | 7–6 |
| 14 | 31 December 1963 | Eri Chiemi | Teru Miyata | Shōzaburō Ishii | Red | 7-7 |
| 15 | 31 December 1964 | Eri Chiemi | Teru Miyata | Shōzaburō Ishii | White | 8–7 |
| 16 | 31 December 1965 | Michiko Hayashi | Teru Miyata | Shōzaburō Ishii | White | 9–7 |
| 17 | 31 December 1966 | Peggy Hayama | Teru Miyata | Shōzaburō Ishii | Red | 9–8 |
| 18 | 31 December 1967 | Yumiko Kokonoe | Teru Miyata | Shōzaburō Ishii | Red | 9-9 |
| 19 | 31 December 1968 | Kiyoko Suizenji | Kyu Sakamoto | Teru Miyata | White | 10–9 |
| 20 | 31 December 1969 | Yukari Itō | Kyu Sakamoto | Teru Miyata | Red | 10-10 |
| 21 | 31 December 1970 | Hibari Misora | Teru Miyata | Shizuo Yamakawa | Red | 10–11 |
| 22 | 31 December 1971 | Kiyoko Suizenji | Teru Miyata | Shizuo Yamakawa | White | 11-11 |
| 23 | 31 December 1972 | Naomi Sagara | Teru Miyata | Shizuo Yamakawa | Red | 11–12 |
| 24 | 31 December 1973 | Kiyoko Suizenji | Teru Miyata | Shizuo Yamakawa | Red | 11–13 |
| 25 | 31 December 1974 | Naomi Sagara | Shizuo Yamakawa | Masao Domon & Yōzō Nakae | Red | 11–14 |
| 26 | 31 December 1975 | Naomi Sagara | Shizuo Yamakawa | Hiroshi Aikawa | White | 12–14 |
| 27 | 31 December 1976 | Naomi Sagara | Shizuo Yamakawa | Hiroshi Aikawa | Red | 12–15 |
| 28 | 31 December 1977 | Naomi Sagara | Shizuo Yamakawa | Hiroshi Aikawa | White | 13–15 |
| 29 | 31 December 1978 | Mitsuko Mori | Shizuo Yamakawa | Hiroshi Aikawa | White | 14–15 |
| 30 | 31 December 1979 | Kiyoko Suizenji | Shizuo Yamakawa | Yōzō Nakae | Red | 14–16 |
| 31 | 31 December 1980 | Tetsuko Kuroyanagi | Shizuo Yamakawa | Yōzō Nakae | Red | 14–17 |
| 32 | 31 December 1981 | Tetsuko Kuroyanagi | Shizuo Yamakawa | Keiichi Ubukata | White | 15–17 |
| 33 | 31 December 1982 | Tetsuko Kuroyanagi | Shizuo Yamakawa | Keiichi Ubukata | Red | 15–18 |
| 34 | 31 December 1983 | Tetsuko Kuroyanagi | Kenji Suzuki | Tamori | White | 16–18 |
| 35 | 31 December 1984 | Mitsuko Mori | Kenji Suzuki | Keiichi Ubukata | Red | 16–19 |
| 36 | 31 December 1985 | Masako Mori | Kenji Suzuki | Masaho Senda | Red | 16–20 |
| 37 | 31 December 1986 | Yuki Saito & Yoriko Mekata | Yūzō Kayama & Masaho Senda | Seiichi Yoshikawa | White | 17–20 |
| 38 | 31 December 1987 | Akiko Wada | Yūzō Kayama | Seiichi Yoshikawa | Red | 17–21 |
| 39 | 31 December 1988 | Akiko Wada | Yūzō Kayama | Keiko Sugiura | White | 18–21 |
HEISEI ERA
| 40 | 31 December 1989 | Yoshiko Mita | Tetsuya Takeda | Sadatomo Matsudaira | Red | 18–22 |
| 41 | 31 December 1990 | Yoshiko Mita | Toshiyuki Nishida | Sadatomo Matsudaira | White | 19–22 |
| 42 | 31 December 1991 | Yūko Asano | Masaaki Sakai | Shizuo Yamakawa | Red | 19–23 |
| 43 | 31 December 1992 | Hikari Ishida | Masaaki Sakai | Shizuo Yamakawa | White | 20–23 |
| 44 | 31 December 1993 | Hikari Ishida | Masaaki Sakai | Miyuki Morita | White | 21–23 |
| 45 | 31 December 1994 | Emiko Kaminuma | Ichiro Furutachi | Yasuo Miyakawa | Red | 21–24 |
| 46 | 31 December 1995 | Emiko Kaminuma | Ichiro Furutachi | Ryūji Miyamoto & Mitsuyo Kusano | White | 22–24 |
| 47 | 31 December 1996 | Takako Matsu | Ichiro Furutachi | Ryūji Miyamoto & Mitsuyo Kusano | White | 23–24 |
| 48 | 31 December 1997 | Akiko Wada | Masahiro Nakai | Ryūji Miyamoto | White | 24-24 |
| 49 | 31 December 1998 | Junko Kubo | Masahiro Nakai | Ryūji Miyamoto | Red | 24–25 |
| 50 | 31 December 1999 | Junko Kubo | Nakamura Kankurō V | Ryūji Miyamoto | White | 25-25 |
| 51 | 31 December 2000 | Junko Kubo | Motoya Izumi | Ryūji Miyamoto | Red | 25–26 |
| 52 | 31 December 2001 | Yumiko Udo | Wataru Abe | Tamio Miyake | White | 26-26 |
| 53 | 31 December 2002 | Yumiko Udo | Wataru Abe | Tamio Miyake | Red | 26–27 |
| 54 | 31 December 2003 | Yumiko Udo & Takako Zenba | Wataru Abe & Tetsuya Takayama | Tōko Takeuchi | White | 27-27 |
| 55 | 31 December 2004 | Fumie Ono | Wataru Abe | Masaaki Horio | Red | 27–28 |
| 56 | 31 December 2005 | Yukie Nakama | Koji Yamamoto (Note: In the 56th edition, the roles of mediator and team host were blurred as all four hosts intermingled with both teams.) | Mino Monta and Motoyo Yamane | White | 28-28 |
| 57 | 31 December 2006 | Yukie Nakama | Masahiro Nakai | Tamio Miyake & Megumi Kurosaki | White | 29–28 |
| 58 | 31 December 2007 | Masahiro Nakai (Note: Masahiro Nakai is the first male team host of the Red team since Teru Miyata in the 6th and 7th editions. Red team hosts (even in pairs) are usually female.) | Shōfukutei Tsurube II | Kazuya Matsumoto & Miki Sumiyoshi | White | 30–28 |
| 59 | 31 December 2008 | Yukie Nakama | Masahiro Nakai | Kazuya Matsumoto | White | 31–28 |
| 60 | 31 December 2009 | Yukie Nakama | Masahiro Nakai | Wataru Abe | White | 32–28 |
| 61 | 31 December 2010 | Nao Matsushita | Arashi (Note: All five members of Arashi act as one host-unit, although at least one member would appear on stage to take the role.) | Wataru Abe | White | 33–28 |
| 62 | 31 December 2011 | Mao Inoue | Arashi | Wataru Abe | Red | 33–29 |
| 63 | 31 December 2012 | Maki Horikita | Arashi | Yumiko Udo | White | 34–29 |
| 64 | 31 December 2013 | Haruka Ayase | Arashi | Yumiko Udo | White | 35–29 |
| 65 | 31 December 2014 | Yuriko Yoshitaka | Arashi | Yumiko Udo | White | 36–29 |
| 66 | 31 December 2015 | Haruka Ayase | Yoshihiko Inohara | Tetsuko Kuroyanagi | Red | 36–30 |
| 67 | 31 December 2016 | Kasumi Arimura | Masaki Aiba | Shinichi Takeda | Red | 36–31 |
| 68 | 31 December 2017 | Kasumi Arimura | Kazunari Ninomiya | Teruyoshi Uchimura & Maho Kuwako | White | 37–31 |
| 69 | 31 December 2018 | Suzu Hirose | Sho Sakurai | Teruyoshi Uchimura & Maho Kuwako | White | 38–31 |
REIWA ERA
| 70 | 31 December 2019 | Haruka Ayase | Sho Sakurai | Teruyoshi Uchimura & Mayuko Wakuda | White | 39–31 |
| 71 | 31 December 2020 | Fumi Nikaido | Yo Oizumi | Teruyoshi Uchimura & Maho Kuwako | Red | 39–32 |
| 72 | 31 December 2021 | Haruna Kawaguchi, Yo Oizumi, and Mayuko Wakuda (Note: Starting with this edition, the hosts take a neutral position.) | | | Red | 39–33 |
| 73 | 31 December 2022 | Kanna Hashimoto, Yo Oizumi, Sho Sakurai and Maho Kuwako | | | White | 40–33 |
| 74 | 31 December 2023 | Kanna Hashimoto, Hiroiki Ariyoshi, Minami Hamabe and Kozo Takase | | | Red | 40–34 |
| 75 | 31 December 2024 | Kanna Hashimoto, Hiroiki Ariyoshi, Sairi Ito and Naoko Suzuki | | | White | 41–34 |
| 76 | 31 December 2025 | Haruka Ayase, Hiroiki Ariyoshi, Mio Imada and Naoko Suzuki | | | White | 42–34 |
| 77 | 31 December 2026 | Mana Ashida, Masato Sakai, Kazunari Ninomiya and Naoko Suzuki | | | | |
The white team has won 42 of the 76 contests as of 2025.

== Popularity ==
Kōhaku was once the most-watched show on Japanese television of the year. One major factor was that New Year's Eve in Japan is a holiday traditionally spent at home (see Ōmisoka). Over the years, the annual event's popularity has declined from an all-time high of an 81.4 rating in 1963 to a low of 30.6 in the Kantō region for the first part of the 2006 event. The 2021 Kōhaku program set a record low for the second portion of the show with a 34.3 viewership rating in the Kantō region. Despite the drop, Kōhaku is consistently the top-rated musical event each year.

Outside Japan, Taiwan also hosts a similar Kōhaku competition, Super Star (超級巨星紅白藝能大賞), which broadcasts on the eve of Chinese New Year. Similar to Kōhaku, the special is held at a live venue, Taipei Arena. Unlike Kōhaku, Super Star does not have gender-affiliated teams and the special is pre-recorded weeks before airing instead of being a live broadcast. The first special premiered on February 13, 2010, the eve of the 2010s Chinese New Year. The most recent special was set to be broadcast on February 9, 2024.

== Notable participants ==
=== Japanese entertainers ===
The following is a list of acts with notable contributions to the Japanese entertainment industry, and have a minimum of five appearances on Kōhaku to their credit (appearance numbers in parentheses are as of the 76th edition):

==== Pop, rock, and other contemporary ====
- Ai Otsuka (大塚 愛) (6)
- Aiko (15)
- AKB48 (13)
- Akiko Wada (和田 アキ子) (39)
- Akina Nakamori (中森 明菜) (7)
- Akira Fuse (布施 明) (26)
- Angela Aki (安藝 聖世美) (6)
- Anri (杏里) (22)
- Arashi (嵐) (12)
- AAA (7)
- Aya Matsuura (松浦 亜弥) (5)^{1}
- Ayaka (絢香) (8)
- Ayaka Hirahara (平原 綾香) (8)
- Ayumi Hamasaki (浜崎 あゆみ) (15)
- Ayumi Ishida (いしだ あゆみ) (10)
- Chemistry (5)
- Chisato Moritaka (森高 千里) (6)
- Da Pump (6)
- Dreams Come True (15)
- E-girls (5)
- Every Little Thing (8)
- Exile (12)
- Four Leaves (7)
- Gackt (5)
- Gen Hoshino (星野 源) (10)
- Goro Noguchi (野口 五郎) (11)
- Gospellers (6)
- Hideaki Tokunaga (德永 英明) (10)
- Hideki Saijō (西城 秀樹) (18)
- Hikaru Genji (6)
- Hiroko Moriguchi (森口 博子) (6)
- Hiromi Go (郷 ひろみ) (38)
- Hiromi Iwasaki (岩崎 宏美) (14)
- Hiromi Ōta (太田 裕美) (5)
- Ikimono-gakari (いきものがかり) (10)
- Ikue Sakakibara (榊原 郁恵) (6)
- Izumi Yukihara (雪村 いづみ) (10)
- Junko Sakurada (桜田 淳子) (9)
- Junretsu (純烈) (8)
- Kana Nishino (西野 カナ) (10)
- Kanjani Eight (関ジャニ∞) (11)
- Ken Hirai (平井 堅) (8)
- Kenji Sawada (沢田 研二) (17)
- King & Prince (6)
- Kobukuro (コブクロ) (7)
- Kome Kome Club (米米CLUB) (5)
- Kumi Koda (倖田 來未) (8)
- Kyōko Koizumi (小泉 今日子) (5)
- Kyū Sakamoto (坂本 九) (11)
- L'Arc-en-Ciel (5)
- Linda Yamamoto (山本 リンダ) (5)
- Masaaki Sakai (堺 正章) (7)
- Masaharu Fukuyama (福山 雅治) (18)
- Masahiko Kondō (近藤 真彦) (10)
- Masashi Sada (さだ まさし) (19)
- Masayuki Suzuki (鈴木 雅之) (6)
- Mayumi Itsuwa (五輪 真弓) (5)
- MAX (5)
- Mie Nakao (中尾 ミエ) (8)
- Miho Nakayama (中山 美穂) (7)
- Mika Nakashima (中島 美嘉) (9)
- Misia (10)
- Mizue Takada (高田 みづえ) (7)
- Momoe Yamaguchi (山口 百恵) (6)
- Morning Musume (モーニング娘) (10)
- Namie Amuro (安室 奈美恵) (9)
- Nana Mizuki (水樹 奈々) (6)
- Naoko Kawai (河合 奈保子) (6)
- Naoko Ken (研 ナオコ) (11)
- Naomi Sagara (佐良 直美) (13)
- Nogizaka46 (乃木坂46) (11)
- Perfume (17)
- Porno Graffitti (ポルノグラフィティ) (11)
- Rumiko Koyanagi (小柳 ルミ子) (18)
- Ryōko Moriyama (森山 良子) (10)
- Saori Minami (南 沙織) (8)
- Sandaime J Soul Brothers (7)
- Seiko Matsuda (松田 聖子) (22)
- Sekai no Owari (6)
- Sexy Zone (6)
- Shinji Tanimura (谷村 新司) (16)
- Shizuka Kudo (工藤 静香) (9)
- Shonentai (8)
- SMAP (23)
- Superfly (8)
- T.M.Revolution (5)
- Tokio (24)
- Tomomi Kahara (華原 朋美) (5)
- Toshihiko Tahara (田原 俊彦) (7)
- W-inds (6)
- X Japan (8)
- Yo Hitoto (一青 窈) (5)
- Yōko Oginome (荻野目 洋子) (5)
- Yūzō Kayama (加山 雄三) (17)
- Yuzu (ゆず) (14)

1. Matsuura has also appeared with DEF.DIVA and GAM. However, NHK does not count those appearances towards her count.

==== Enka ====
- Aki Yashiro (八代 亜紀) (23)
- Akira Kobayashi (小林 旭) (7)
- Aya Shimazu (島津 亜矢) (5)
- Ayako Fuji (藤 あや子) (21)
- Chiyoko Shimakura (島倉 千代子) (35)
- Frank Nagai (フランク 永井) (26)
- Fuyumi Sakamoto (坂本 冬美) (37)
- George Yamamoto (山本 譲二) (11)
- Harumi Miyako (都 はるみ) (29)
- Haruo Minami (三波 春夫) (50)
- Hibari Misora (美空 ひばり) (18)
- Hideo Murata (村田 英雄) (27)
- Hiromi Go (郷ひろみ) (36)
- Hiroshi Itsuki (五木 ひろし) (48)
- Hiroshi Miyama (三山 ひろし) (11)
- Ichirō Toba (鳥羽 一郎) (20)
- Kaori Kozai (香西 かおり) (19)
- Kaori Mizumori (水森 かおり) (23)
- Keisuke Yamauchi (山内惠介) (10)
- Keiko Fuji (藤 圭子) (5)
- Kenichi Mikawa (美川 憲一) (26)
- Kiyoko Suizenji (水前寺 清子) (22)
- Kiyoshi Hikawa (氷川 きよし) (25)
- Kiyoshi Maekawa (前川 清) (18)
- Masako Mori (森 昌子) (15)
- Masao Sen (千 昌夫) (19)
- Mina Aoe (青江 三奈) (18)
- Mitsuko Nakamura (中村 美律子) (15)
- Miyuki Kawanaka (川中 美幸) (24)
- Naomi Chiaki (ちあき なおみ) (9)
- Natsuko Godai (伍代 夏子) (22)
- Rimi Natsukawa (夏川 りみ) (6)
- Saburō Kitajima (北島 三郎) (50)
- Sachiko Kobayashi (小林 幸子) (33)
- Saori Yuki and Sachiko Yasuda (11)^{1}
- Sayuri Ishikawa (石川 さゆり) (48)
- Shinichi Mori (森 進一) (48)
- Takao Horiuchi (堀内 孝雄) (17)
- Takashi Hosokawa (細川 たかし) (39)
- Yōko Nagayama (長山 洋子) (14)
- Yoshimi Tendo (天童 よしみ) (30)
- Yutaka Yamakawa (山川 豊) (11)

1. Saori Yuki and Sachiko Yasuda are counted as a duet. Solo appearances by either of the two would not count towards the duet count.

=== Foreigners ===
Although Kōhaku is made up of mostly Japanese entertainers, foreign artists (artists who are not Japanese nationals) popular in Japan have competed in the program. Special appearances, supporting musicians or other methods of participation where the artist or group's performance was not accounted for in the overall scoring should not be added to this list. Below is a list of artists or groups who have done so, categorized based on the country of origin (Asian or non-Asian) the person or majority of the members in a group are from, along with the editions:

==== Asian ====
South Korea

- BoA (53rd through 58th)
- Cho Yong-Pil (38th through 41st)
- Girls' Generation (62nd)
- Ive (73rd)
- Kara (62nd)
- Kye Eun-sook (39th through 45th)
- Lee Jung Hyun (55th)
- Le Sserafim (73rd, 74th, and 75th)
- Patti Kim (40th)
- Ryu (55th)
- Seventeen (74th)
- Stray Kids (74th)
- TVXQ (59th, 60th, and 62nd)
- Twice (68th, 69th, 70th, 73rd, and 75th)
- Kim Yon-ja (40th, 45th, and 52nd)
- NewJeans (74th)
- MiSaMo (74th)
- Tomorrow X Together (75th)
- Illit (75th and 76th)
- Aespa (76th)

Taiwan

- Vivian Hsu (49th)
- Chiu Pin-han of AKB48 Team TP (70th)
- Judy Ongg (30th and 31st)
- Ouyang Feifei (23rd, 24th, and 42nd)
- Teresa Teng (36th, 37th, and 42nd)

Philippines

- Smokey Mountain (42nd)
- Abby Trinidad of MNL48 (70th)
- Gary Valenciano (41st)

Hong Kong

- Agnes Chan (24th through 26th)
- Alan Tam (40th)

Thailand

- BNK48 (69th as a whole and 70th through Pimrapat "Mobile" Phadungwatanachok)
- Sita Teeradechsakul of CGM48 (70th)

China

- Liu Nian of AKB48 Team SH (70th)
- Twelve Girls Band (54th)

Other

- Khushi "Glory" Dua of DEL48 (India, 70th)
- JKT48 (Indonesia, 62nd as a whole and 70th through Shani Indira Natio)
- Dick Lee, Lim Hyung-joo, Xu Ke, and Amin (Singapore, South Korea, and China respectively, 56th)
- Oyunaa (Mongolia, 41st)
- Trần Cát Tường ("Anna") of SGO48 (Vietnam, 70th)

==== Non-Asian ====
United States

- Leah Dizon (58th)
- Chris Hart (64th and 65th)
- Jero (59th and 60th)
- Cyndi Lauper (41st)
- Agnes Lum (28th)
- John Ken Nuzzo (53rd and 55th)
- James Shigeta (8th and 9th)
- Paul Simon (41st)
- The Ventures (42nd)
- Alyson Williams (41st)
- Andy Williams (42nd)

Other

- Sarah Brightman (United Kingdom, 42nd and 69th)
- Alfredo Casero (Argentina, 53rd)
- Alexander Gradsky (Russia, 41st)
- Márcia (Brazil, 41st)
- Laima Vaikule (Latvia, 42nd)
- Rosanna Zambon (Italy, 21st and 22nd)
