= Athletics at the 1957 World University Games – Women's javelin throw =

The women's javelin throw event at the 1957 World University Games was held at the Stadium Charlety in Paris on 5 September 1957.

== Results ==
Rank	Name	Nationality	#1	#2	#3	#4	#5	#6	Result	Notes
1st place, gold medalist(s)	Maria Diţi	Romania	50.63	49.50	52.38	52.38	52.07	50.79	52.38	NR
2nd place, silver medalist(s)	Inese Jaunzeme	Soviet Union	45.96	46.41	48.13	42.15	52.19	47.99	52.19	
3rd place, bronze medalist(s)	Almut Brömmel	West Germany	47.12	51.76	47.85	45.02	45.19	50.78	51.76	
4	Urszula Figwer	Poland	48.69	49.30	48.53	49.22	45.30	46.58	49.30	
5	Galina Zybina	Soviet Union	x	44.55	45.74	44.49	46.53	44.95	46.53	
6	Cmiljka Kalušević	Yugoslavia	x	44.65	40.46	41.80	43.16	37.35	44.65	
7	Edith Schiller	West Germany							42.30	
8	Monica Podmore	Great Britain							35.12	
