= Yoriko =

- Gender: Female

Origin
- Origin: Japanese
- Meaning: Different meanings depending on the kanji used

Yoriko (written: 頼子, 順子, 依子 or より子) is a feminine Japanese given name. Notable people with the name include:

- Yorico (より子; born 1984), Japanese singer-songwriter
- Yoriko Angeline (born 2002), Indonesian actors and singers
- Yoriko Dōguchi (洞口 依子; born 1965), Japanese actress
- Yoriko Kawaguchi (川口 順子; born 1941), Japanese politician
- Yoriko Kunihara (國原 頼子; born 1985), Japanese judoka
- Yoriko Madoka (円 より子; born 1947), Japanese politician
- Yoriko Mekata (目加田 頼子; born 1960), Japanese television announcer
- Yoriko Okamoto (岡本 依子; born 1971), Japanese taekwondo practitioner
- Yoriko Shida (志田 順子; born 1935), Japanese javelin thrower
- Yoriko Shono (笙野 頼子; born 1956), Japanese writer

== Fictional characters ==
- Yoriko Fujiwara (藤原 依子), a character in the manga series Tachibanakan To Lie Angle
- Yoriko Inui (乾 依子), a character in the anime series Just Because!
- Yoriko Matsumoto (松本 頼子), a character in the manga series Yuyushiki
- Yoriko Nikaidou (二階堂 頼子), a character in the manga series You're Under Arrest
- Yoriko Sudō (朱藤 依子), a character in the light novel series Lance N' Masques
- Yoriko Yasaka (八坂 頼子), a character in the light novel series Haiyore! Nyaruko-san
- Yoriko Yasuzumi (安栖 頼子), a character in the video game series Arcana Heart
- Yoriko Anno (安野 依子), a character from the PlayStation 2 horror video game, Forbidden Siren
