= Masters W70 javelin 400g world record progression =

Masters W70 javelin world record progression is the progression of world record improvements of the javelin throw W70 division of Masters athletics. Records must be set in properly conducted, official competitions under the standing IAAF rules unless modified by World Masters Athletics. The W70 division consists of female athletes who have reached the age of 70 but have not yet reached the age of 75, so exactly from their 70th birthday to the day before their 75th birthday. The W70 division threw the 400g javelin until the end of 2013. Since 2014, the W70 division throws a 500 g implement. These are the records for the 400g javelin. WMA discontinued this weight after the end of 2013. The records will be officially recognized along with 500g records until the lighter weight mark is surpassed.

Key

Incomplete information Pending

Distance	Athlete	Nationality	Birthdate	Location	Date
33.73	Evaun Williams	United Kingdom	19.12.1937	Lahti	28.07.2009
30.58	Margareth Tosh	Canada	13.09.1937	Regina	20.07.2008
30.54	Birutė Kalėdienė	Lithuania	02.02.1933	Poznań	20.07.2006
28.89	Sigrun Kofink	Germany	23.04.1935	Vaterstetten	16.07.2005
28.20	Jo Ogden	United Kingdom	18.06.1927	London	24.08.1997
