= Hye-ja =

- Hangul: 혜자
- RR: Hyeja
- MR: Hyeja

Hye-ja is a Korean given name.

Typically, "ja" is written with a hanja meaning "child" (子). Names ending with this hanja, such as Young-ja and Jeong-ja, were popular when Korea was under Japanese rule, but declined in popularity afterwards.

== People ==
People with this name include:

- Patti Kim (singer) (born Kim Hye-ja, 1938), South Korean singer
- Han Hye-ja (born 1941), South Korean speed skater
- Kim Hye-ja (born 1941), South Korean actress
- Lee Hye-ja (born 1947), South Korean track and field athlete
- Kang Hye-ja (born 1966), South Korean sport shooter

Fictional characters with this name include:

- Kang Hye-ja, in 2009 South Korean television series He Who Can't Marry
- Pi Hye-ja, in 2009 South Korean television series Assorted Gems
- Lee Hye-ja, in 2011 South Korean television series While You Were Sleeping

== See also ==
- List of Korean given names
