= Athletics at the 1952 Summer Olympics – Women's javelin throw =

Women's javelin throw at the Games of the XV Olympiad
- Venue: Helsinki Olympic Stadium
- Date: July 24, 1952
- Competitors: 19 from 13 nations
- Winning distance: 50.47 OR

Medalists
| 1st place, gold medalist(s) | | Dana Zátopková; Czechoslovakia |
| 2nd place, silver medalist(s) | | Aleksandra Chudina; Soviet Union |
| 3rd place, bronze medalist(s) | | Yelena Gorchakova; Soviet Union |

The Women's javelin throw at the 1952 Olympic Games took place on 24 July at the Helsinki Olympic Stadium. Czech athlete Dana Zátopková won the gold medal and set a new Olympic record.

== Records ==
Prior to this competition, the existing world and Olympic records were as follows.

| World record | (Soviet Union) Natalya Smirnitskaya (URS) | 53.41 m | Moscow, Soviet Union | 1949 |
| Olympic record | Herma Bauma (AUT) | 45.57 m | London, United Kingdom | 31 July 1948 |

The following record was set during this competition.

| Date | Event | Athlete | Distance | OR | WR |
|---|---|---|---|---|---|
| 24 July | Final | Dana Zátopková (TCH) | 50.47 m | OR | |

== Results ==
=== Qualifying round ===
Qualification: Qualifying Performance 38.00 m advance to the Final.

| Rank | Athlete | Nationality | Result | Notes |
|---|---|---|---|---|
| 1 | Aleksandra Chudina | Soviet Union | 46.17 | OR |
| 2 | Galina Zybina | Soviet Union | 45.95 | |
| 3 | Dana Zátopková | Czechoslovakia | 45.57 | |
| 4 | Yelena Gorchakova | Soviet Union | 45.18 | |
| 5 | Marlies Müller | Germany | 44.99 | |
| 6 | Jutta Krüger | Germany | 43.43 | |
| 7 | Herma Bauma | Austria | 43.07 | |
| 8 | Marjorie Larney | United States | 41.44 | |
| 9 | Inge Bausenwein | Germany | 40.53 | |
| 10 | Anni Rättyä | Finland | 40.47 | |
| 11 | Estrella Puente | Uruguay | 40.10 | |
| 12 | Maria Ciach | Poland | 39.96 | |
| 13 | Lily Carlstedt-Kelsby | Denmark | 39.61 | |
| 14 | Diane Coates | Great Britain | 39.45 | |
| 15 | Ada Turci | Italy | 39.31 | |
| 16 | Elsa Torikka | Finland | 39.27 | |
| 17 | Kaisa Parviainen | Finland | 39.10 | |
| 18 | Gerda Martín | Chile | 36.94 | |
| 19 | Amalia Yubi | Mexico | 35.59 | |
| | Edith Thomas | Chile | NM | |
| | Gerda Schilling-Staniek | Austria | NM | |

=== Final ===
| Rank | Athlete | Nationality | 1 | 2 | 3 | 4 | 5 | 6 | Result | Notes |
|---|---|---|---|---|---|---|---|---|---|---|
| 1st place, gold medalist(s) | Dana Zátopková | Czechoslovakia | 50.47 | 41.34 | 46.28 | 43.45 | 45.62 | 47.63 | 50.47 | OR |
| 2nd place, silver medalist(s) | Aleksandra Chudina | Soviet Union | 46.71 | 45.20 | 47.50 | x | 49.61 | 50.01 | 50.01 | |
| 3rd place, bronze medalist(s) | Yelena Gorchakova | Soviet Union | 46.67 | 49.76 | 48.27 | 45.28 | 43.10 | 43.28 | 49.76 | |
| 4 | Galina Zybina | Soviet Union | 44.86 | 48.35 | 47.24 | 47.94 | 47.81 | 45.95 | 48.35 | |
| 5 | Lily Carlstedt-Kelsby | Denmark | 46.23 | 40.90 | 45.30 | 42.38 | 44.82 | 44.77 | 46.23 | |
| 6 | Marlies Müller | Germany | x | 44.37 | x | 43.21 | x | 43.08 | 44.37 | |
| 7 | Maria Ciach | Poland | 42.55 | 43.53 | 44.31 | | | | 44.31 | |
| 8 | Jutta Krüger | Germany | 44.30 | 42.17 | 41.77 | | | | 44.30 | |
| 9 | Herma Bauma | Austria | 42.54 | 42.27 | 41.13 | | | | 42.54 | |
| 10 | Estrella Puente | Uruguay | 39.41 | 41.44 | | | | | 41.44 | |
| 11 | Ada Turci | Italy | 41.15 | 41.20 | 40.03 | | | | 41.20 | |
| 12 | Inge Bausenwein | Germany | 41.16 | 39.60 | 39.55 | | | | 41.16 | |
| 13 | Marjorie Larney | United States | x | 40.58 | 36.04 | | | | 40.58 | |
| 14 | Anni Rättyä | Finland | 40.33 | 38.85 | 40.56 | | | | 40.56 | |
| 15 | Diane Coates | Great Britain | 40.17 | 39.28 | 38.55 | | | | 40.17 | |
| 16 | Kaisa Parviainen | Finland | 38.03 | 39.82 | x | | | | 39.82 | |
| 17 | Elsa Torikka | Finland | 39.58 | x | 36.73 | | | | 39.58 | |
