= Torikka =

Torikka is a Finnish surname.

== Geographical distribution ==
As of 2014, 89.1% of all known bearers of the surname Torikka were residents of Finland (frequency 1:9,223), 7.6% of Sweden (1:193,074) and 1.6% of Canada (1:3,345,273).

In Finland, the frequency of the surname was higher than national average (1:9,223) in the following regions:

1. South Karelia (1:2,743)
2. Southwest Finland (1:3,830)
3. Southern Savonia (1:4,615)
4. Lapland (1:5,251)
5. Päijänne Tavastia (1:5,734)
6. Tavastia Proper (1:5,763)
7. Kymenlaakso (1:6,836)

== People ==
- Elsa Torikka (born 1930), Finnish javelin thrower
- Timo Torikka (born 1958), Finnish actor
