= Erika Strößenreuther =

German javelin thrower (1938–2021)

Personal information
- Nationality: German
- Born: 5 August 1938 Munich, West Germany
- Died: 10 September 2021 (aged 83) Munich, Germany

Sport
- Sport: Athletics
- Event: Javelin throw

Erika Strößenreuther (5 August 1938 – 10 September 2021) was a German athlete. She competed in the women's javelin throw at the 1960 Summer Olympics. Strößenreuther died on 10 September 2021, at the age of 83.
