= Misako Katayama =

Japanese javelin thrower (born 1944)

Personal information
- Nationality: Japanese
- Born: 11 April 1944 (age 81)

Sport
- Sport: Athletics
- Event: Javelin throw

Misako Katayama (片山 美佐子, Katayama Misako; born 11 April 1944) is a Japanese track and field athlete. She competed in the women's javelin throw at the 1964 Summer Olympics.
