= June Heath =

Australian athlete (1929–1993)

Personal information
- Full name: June Margaret Heath
- Nationality: Australian
- Born: 29 June 1929
- Died: 14 August 1993 (aged 64) New South Wales, Australia

Sport
- Sport: Athletics
- Event: Javelin throw

June Margaret Heath (29 June 1929 – 14 August 1993) was an Australian athlete. She competed in the women's javelin throw at the 1956 Summer Olympics.
