= Lise Koch =

Danish javelin thrower

Personal information
- Nationality: Danish
- Born: 7 September 1938 Aarhus, Denmark
- Died: 29 February 2004 (aged 65)

Sport
- Sport: Athletics, Handball
- Event: Javelin throw
Medal record
Representing Denmark
World Championships
Silver medal – second place	1962 Romania	Team

Lise Koch (7 September 1938 – 29 February 2004) was a Danish athlete and handball player. She competed in the women's javelin throw at the 1960 Summer Olympics.

She won six straight Danish championships in javelin throwing between 1957 and 1962, and at one point held the Danish record at 50.22 meters, which she threw in 1960.

In addition to athletics, she also played handball at the Danish club IK Skovbakken. She was part of the Danish team that won silver medals at the 1962 World Championship in Romania.
