= Inge Bausenwein =

German javelin thrower

Personal information
- Nationality: German
- Born: 13 October 1920 Nuremberg, Germany
- Died: 1 September 2008 (aged 87) Nuremberg, Germany

Sport
- Sport: Athletics
- Event: Javelin throw

Inge Bausenwein (13 October 1920 – 1 September 2008) was a German athlete. She competed in the women's javelin throw at the 1952 Summer Olympics.
