= Anni Rättyä =

Finnish javelin thrower (1934–2021)

Personal information
- Nationality: Finnish
- Born: 4 January 1934 Nivala, Finland
- Died: 25 July 2021 (aged 87)

Sport
- Sport: Athletics
- Event: Javelin throw

Anni Rättyä (4 January 1934 – 25 July 2021) was a Finnish athlete. She competed in the women's javelin throw at the 1952 Summer Olympics.
