= Athletics at the 1959 Summer Universiade – Women's shot put =

The women's shot put event at the 1959 Summer Universiade was held at the Stadio Comunale di Torino in Turin on 5 September 1959.

== Results ==
Rank	Name	Nationality	Result	Notes
1st place, gold medalist(s)	Lidiya Sharamovich	Bulgaria	13.97	
2nd place, silver medalist(s)	Milena Usenik	Yugoslavia	13.90	
3rd place, bronze medalist(s)	Antonia Vehoff	West Germany	13.11	
4	Urszula Figwer	Poland	13.01	
5	Ursula Nagel	West Germany	12.39	
