= Nicole Saeys =

Belgian javelin thrower (1924–2021)

Personal information
- Nationality: Belgian
- Born: 31 August 1924 Etterbeek, Belgium
- Died: 4 September 2021 (aged 97)

Sport
- Sport: Athletics
- Event: Javelin throw

Nicole Saeys (31 August 1924 – 4 September 2021) was a Belgian athlete. She competed in the women's javelin throw at the 1948 Summer Olympics. Saeys died on 4 September 2021, at the age of 97.
