= Masters M90 800 metres world record progression =

This is the progression of world record improvements of the 800 metres M90 division of Masters athletics.

Key

Incomplete information Pending

Hand	Auto	Athlete	Nationality	Birthdate	Location	Date
	3:34.93	Earl Fee	Canada	22.03.1929	Toronto	22.06.2019
	3:39.07	Toshio Kamehama	Japan	18.10.1925	Gifu	30.10.2015
	4:04.85	Holger Josefsson	Sweden	04.10.1918	Lahti	28.07.2009
	4:19.97 i	Orville Rogers	United States	28.11.1917	Boston	30.03.2008
	4:28.20	Alexander Pittendrich	Australia	13.09.1906	Melbourne	30.03.1997
	4:39.59	Paul Spangler	United States	18.03.1899		10.06.1989
