= Marlies Müller =

German javelin thrower

Personal information
- Nationality: German
- Born: 9 June 1927 Cologne, Germany

Sport
- Sport: Athletics
- Event: Javelin throw

Marlies Müller (born 9 June 1927) was a German athlete. She competed in the women's javelin throw at the 1952 Summer Olympics.
