= Heather Innes =

Australian javelin thrower

Personal information
- Nationality: Australian
- Born: 11 June 1939 (age 87) Smithton, Tasmania, Australia

Sport
- Sport: Athletics
- Event: Javelin throw

Heather Innes (born 11 June 1939) is an Australian athlete. She competed in the women's javelin throw at the 1956 Summer Olympics.
