= Bob Backus =

American hammer thrower

- Born: Robert Hudson Backus; July 11, 1926; Boston, Massachusetts
- Died: June 30, 1999 (aged 72); Boston, Massachusetts
- Education: Tufts University
- Occupations: Track and field athlete

Robert ("Bob") Hudson Backus (July 11, 1926 – June 30, 1999) was an American track and field athlete who set world records in the hammer throw. He wore ballet slippers during competition and after using weight training to overcome the effects of meningitis.

Backus was born on July 11, 1926, in Boston. At 6 feet, 5 inches in height and 160 pounds, Backus was rejected by the United States Army Air Forces' cadet program as he was deemed too thin. As part of his efforts to recover from spinal meningitis, Backus took up weight training and bulked up into a 290-pound strongman, despite concerns that such training would make him "musclebound".

He attended Tufts University, where he started weight throwing, participating in the 16-pound hammer throw outdoors, and the 35 and 56 pound events indoors. Backus was inducted to the Tufts University's Hall of Fame. Because no footwear had yet been developed for the sport, Backus wore ballet shoes.

Backus set a world record and career best of 45 feet 2 inches in the 56-pound throw at the New York Athletic Club's annual spring games, held on June 8, 1957, in Pelham Manor, New York, setting a record that broke a record he had previously set, adding another foot to the world mark. He also set a record in February 1959 for the 35-pound weight with a distance of 66 feet 2¾ inches, one of five world records set at the Amateur Athletic Union's national indoor track and field championships at Madison Square Garden. He won U.S. titles in the 56-pound event each of the seven years from 1953 to 1959 and won seven out of eight years from 1954 to 1961 in the 35-pound throw.

He won the American title in the hammer throw in 1954 and won a gold medal in the event at the 1955 Pan American Games in Mexico City. He competed in the event at the 1952 Summer Olympics, finishing in 13th place.

July 1971 Backus (M40) competed at the 4th Annual Masters Outdoor National Championship placing 2nd to Howard Payne in the HT. March 1975 Backus (M45) competed in the Annual Masters Indoor National Championship and winning the WT. Backus held American Masters M45 and M50 Indoor Weight Throw Records (1976 and 1977). Backus held the American Masters M50 16-Lb Hammer Throw Record in 1977. Backus held the World Masters M55 16-Lb Hammer Throw Record in 1981. In February 1978, a 51-year-old Backus came in second in an otherwise uneventful 35-pound weight throw at the Open AAU National Indoor Championship held at Madison Square Garden.

Backus died at age 72 on June 30, 1999, at Boston's Vencor Hospital, having suffered a stroke in December 1998 and been in poor health for several years before his death. His first marriage, to Elsa Torikka of Finland, who he had met at the 1952 Summer Olympics in Helsinki where she had competed in the javelin, ended in divorce.
