= Virve Roolaid =

Estonian javelin thrower

Personal information
- Born: 2 November 1933 (age 92) Pankjavitsa, Estonia
- Height: 172 cm (5 ft 8 in)
- Weight: 74 kg (163 lb)

Sport
- Sport: Athletics
- Event(s): Javelin throw, shot put, discus throw

Achievements and titles
- Personal best(s): JT – 56.47 m (1963); SP – 13:25 m (1960); DT – 38.62 m (1962)
Medal record
Women's athletics
Representing Soviet Union
European Championships
Silver medal – second place	1954 Bern	Javelin throw

Virve Roolaid (later Põldsam, born 2 November 1933) is a retired Estonian javelin thrower. In 1954 she won a gold medal at the World Student Games, placed second at the European championships, and was ranked second in the world with a throw of 54.89 m.

Roolaid took up athletics in 1951 and won seven Estonian javelin titles, in 1952, 1957, 1960, 1961, 1963, 1965 and 1970. She also competed in the discus throw and shot put.
