= Nadezhda Konyayeva =

Soviet javelin thrower

Medal record

Women's athletics

Representing Soviet Union

Olympic Games
Bronze medal – third place	1956 Melbourne	Javelin throw

European Championships
Bronze medal – third place	1954 Bern	Javelin throw

Nadezhda Yefimovna Konyayeva (Russian: Наде́жда Ефимовна Коня́ева; Ukrainian: Наді́я Єфимівна Коня́єва; born October 5, 1931, date of death unknown) was a Soviet (Ukrainian) athlete who competed mainly in the Javelin. Konyayeva trained at Burevestnik in Kyiv. She competed for the USSR in the 1956 Summer Olympics held in Melbourne in the Javelin where she won the bronze medal.
