= Melania Sinoracka =

Polish javelin thrower (1923–1975)

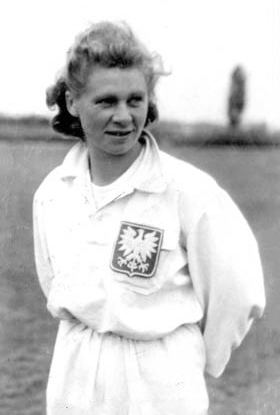
- Sinoracka in 1948

Personal information
- Full name: Melania Maria Sinoracka
- Born: 13 June 1923 Podgórz, Toruń, Poland
- Died: 28 February 1975 (aged 51) Toruń, Poland

Sport
- Sport: Athletics
- Event: Javelin throw
- Club: Pomorzanin Toruń (1945-1948); Kolejarz Toruń (1949–1953); Włókniarz Bydgoszcz (1954)

Achievements and titles
- Personal best: 39.85 m (1948)

Melania Maria Sinoracka (13 June 1923 – 28 February 1975) was a Polish javelin thrower. She competed at the 1948 Olympics and placed 11th.

Sinoracka was born in a working family, and in 1937 began working as a saleswoman for the Toruń Railway. After World War II she was moved to the State Railways Directorate in Toruń and stayed there until 1950. In 1950–1952 she worked at a factory of water meters, and in 1952–1957 at a garment factory.

Sinoracka took up gymnastics in 1937 and changed to athletics in 1938. She won the Polish javelin title in 1947 and 1948; she was also successful in the shot put and played volleyball at the national level.

== International competitions ==
Year	Competition	Venue	Position	Event	Notes
Representing Poland
1948	Olympic Games	London, United Kingdom	11th	Javelin throw	35.74 m

== Personal bests ==
- Shot put – 10.81 metres (1948)
- Discus throw – 27.02 metres (Toruń 1949)
- Javelin throw (old model) – 39.85 metres (Warsaw 1948)
