= Maria Ciach =

Polish javelin thrower (1933–2009)

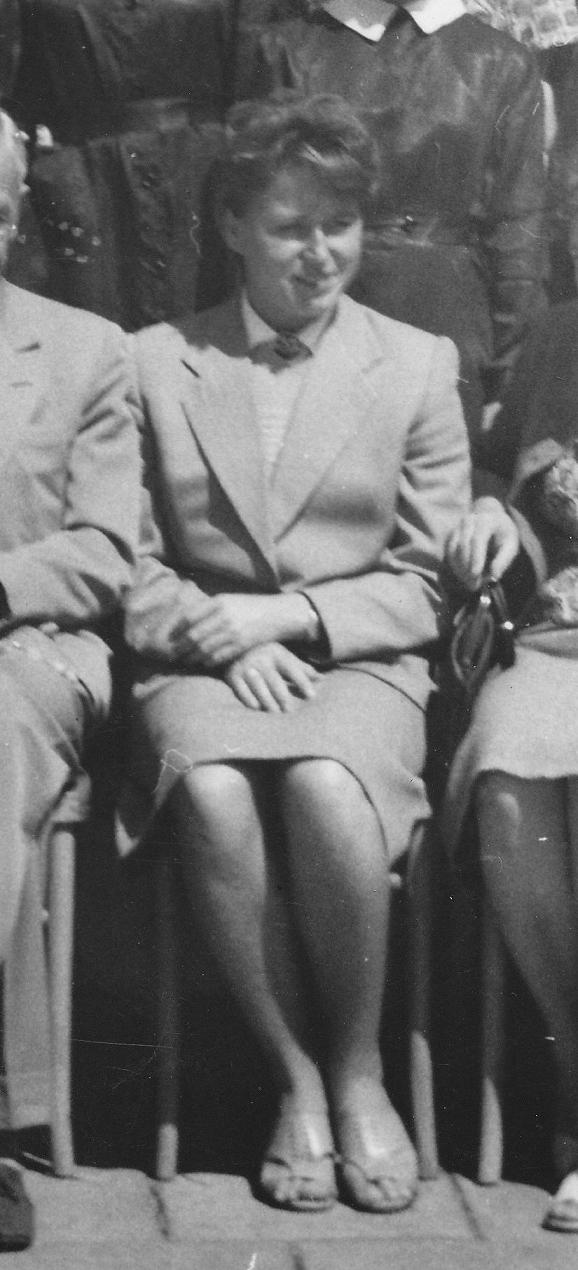
- Maria Ciach in 1970

Personal information
- Full name: Maria Jadwiga Ciach
- Born: 7 September 1933 Tomaszów Mazowiecki, Łódź Voivodeship, Poland
- Died: 25 May 2009 (aged 75) Warsaw, Poland
- Height: 1.63 m (5 ft 4 in)
- Weight: 69 kg (152 lb)

Sport
- Sport: Athletics
- Event: Javelin throw
- Club: Włókniarz Tomaszów

Maria Jadwiga Ciach (married Michalak; 7 September 1933 – 25 May 2009) was a Polish sportswoman. She was born in Tomaszów Mazowiecki in Łódź Voivodeship. She competed at the 1952 Summer Olympics in Helsinki, where she placed seventh in women's javelin throw.

Her personal best in the event was 48.99 set in Warsaw in 1955.

== International competitions ==
| Year | Competition | Venue | Position | Event | Notes |
Representing Poland
| 1952 | Olympic Games | Helsinki, Finland | 7th | Javelin throw | 44.31 m |
| 1953 | World Festival of Youth and Students | Bucharest, Romania | 5th | Javelin throw | 45.59 m |
| 1955 | World Festival of Youth and Students | Warsaw, Poland | 2nd | Javelin throw | 48.99 m |
