= Kay Long =

British javelin thrower

Personal information
- Full name: Marian Katherine Rosalie Long
- Born: 24 September 1920 Kingston upon Thames, England
- Died: 27 December 2007 (aged 87) Southampton, England

Sport
- Sport: Athletics
- Event: Javelin throw

Kay Long (24 September 1920 – 27 December 2007) was a British athlete who competed in the women's javelin throw at the 1948 Summer Olympics.
