= Marlene Ahrens =

Chilean javelin thrower (1933–2020)

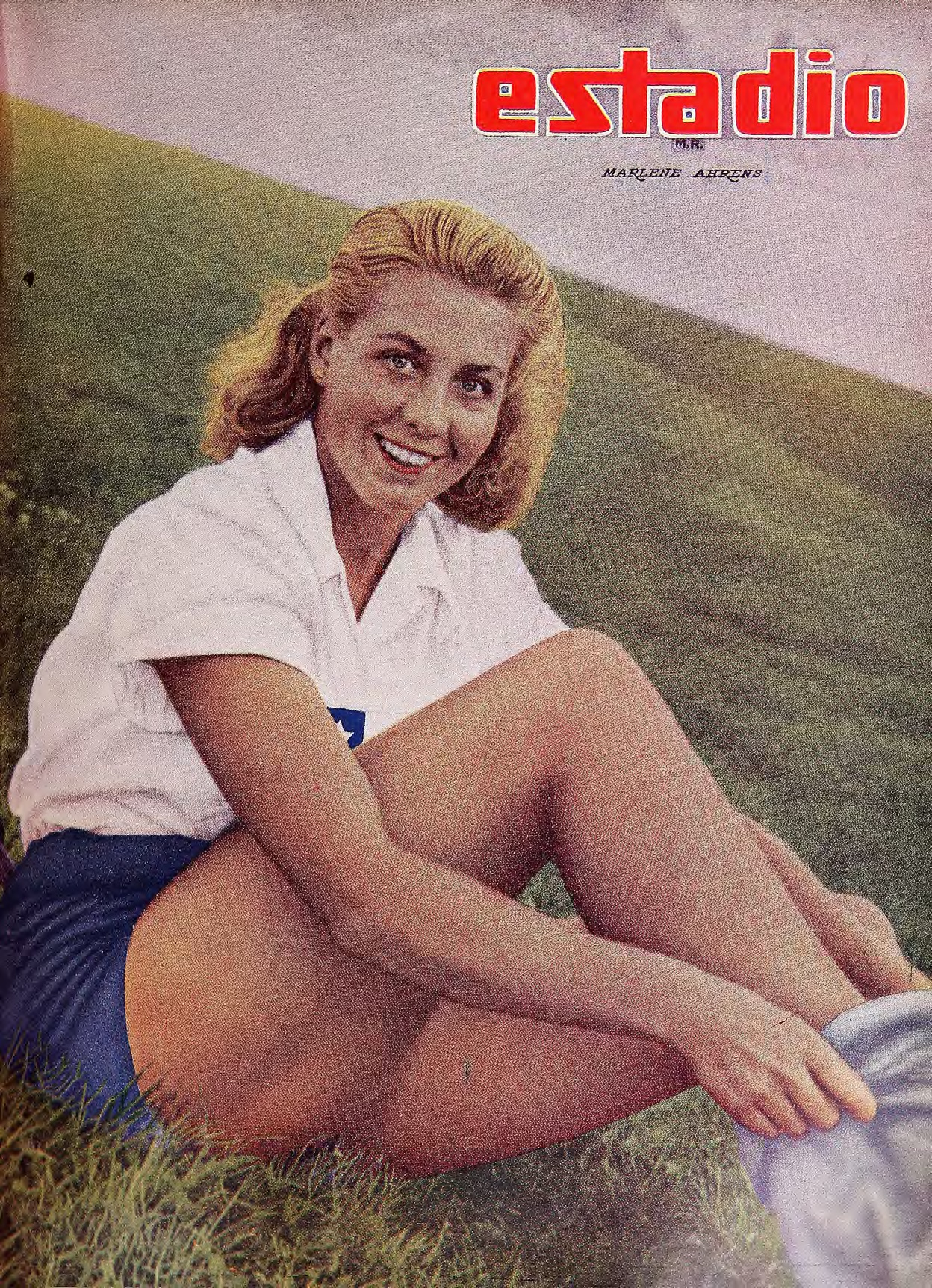
- Ahrens in 1954

Medal record

Women's Athletics

Representing Chile

Olympic Games
Silver medal – second place	1956 Melbourne	Javelin throw

Pan American Games
Gold medal – first place	1959 Chicago	Javelin throw
Gold medal – first place	1963 São Paulo	Javelin throw

Marlene Ahrens Ostertag-Ebensperger (July 27, 1933 – June 17, 2020) was a Chilean athlete. She won the silver medal in Javelin throw at the 1956 Summer Olympics in Melbourne with a distance of 50.38 metres. She was the mother of journalist Karin Ebensperger.

== Biography ==
Ahrens was born in Concepción, Chile, the daughter of German immigrants. In Melbourne, she was the Chilean flag bearer, and the only woman on the Olympic team. She participated in the Javelin throw, winning the silver medal with a distance of 50.38 metres. In doing so, she became the first Chilean woman to win an Olympic medal. She won gold in both 1959 Pan American Games, held in Chicago, and 1963 Pan American Games held in São Paulo. Also, she again was the flag bearer in the 1960 Summer Olympics in Rome, although she did not win a medal. Ahrens was forced to retire after having a dispute with the Chilean newspaper Clarín, and she was banned from competing in the 1964 Summer Olympics in Tokyo.

After athletics she began to play tennis and in 1967, won the Chilean national tournament in mixed doubles with Omar Pabst. Soon after that, she injured her knee and dedicated her life to Equestrianism. She competed in the 1995 Pan American Games in Mar del Plata. She retired from horse riding in 2012, at 79 years old.

She married Jorge Roberto Ebensperger Grassau, a hockey player and another descendant of German settlers; they gave birth to 2 children: Karin Ebensperger and Roberto Ebensperger. She is the grandmother of Marlén Eguiguren, also a journalist like her mother Karin.

On the night of June 17, 2020, Ahrens died of heart failure in Santiago de Chile at the age of 86.

== International competitions ==
Year	Competition	Venue	Position	Event	Notes
Representing Chile
1954	South American Championships	São Paulo, Brazil	4th	Shot put	11.46 m
1954	South American Championships	São Paulo, Brazil	2nd	Javelin throw	41.68 m
1956	South American Championships	Santiago, Chile	1st	Javelin throw	48.73 m
1956	Olympic Games	Helsinki, Finland	2nd	Javelin throw	50.38 m
1958	South American Championships	Montevideo, Uruguay	1st	Javelin throw	43.85 m
1959	Pan American Games	Chicago, United States	1st	Javelin throw	45.38 m
1960	Olympic Games	Rome, Italy	12th	Javelin throw	47.53 m
1961	South American Championships	Lima, Peru	1st	Javelin throw	42.85 m
1962	Ibero-American Games	Madrid, Spain	1st	Javelin throw	45.63 m
1963	Pan American Games	São Paulo, Brazil	1st	Javelin throw	49.93 m
1963	South American Championships	Cali, Colombia	1st	Javelin throw	44.67 m
