= Ada Turci =

Italian javelin thrower (1924–2012)

Personal information
- Nationality: Italian
- Born: 17 January 1924 Quistello
- Died: 3 February 2012 (aged 88) Quistello

Sport
- Country: Italy
- Sport: Athletics
- Event: Javelin throw

Achievements and titles
- Personal best: Javelin throw 43.51 m (1955)

Ada Turci (17 January 1924 – 3 February 2012) was an Italian javelin thrower who competed at the 1952 Summer Olympics,

== Biography ==
Ada Turci did not abandon the competitive sports and continued to compete in masters athletics. She won three more medals at the second edition of the European Veterans Athletics Championships, which were curiously held in Helsinki in 1980, in the city where 28 years before she had participated in the Olympic Games.

== Achievements ==
Senior

Year	Competition	Venue	Event	Position	Measure	Notes
1948	Olympic Games	(Finland) Helsinki	Javelin throw	11th	41.20 m	

Masters

Year	Competition	Venue	Event	Position	Measure	Notes
1980	European Veterans Championships	(Finland) Helsinki	Shot put W55	1st	10.13 m	
1980	European Veterans Championships	(Finland) Helsinki	Discus throw W55	3rd	21.34 m	
1980	European Veterans Championships	(Finland) Helsinki	Javelin throw W55	1st	28.48 m	

== National titles ==
She won 13 (10 consecutive years from 1946 to 1955) national championships at senior level.

- Italian Athletics Championships
  - Javelin throw: 1943, (1945), 1946, 1947, 1948, 1949, 1950, 1951, 1952, 1953, 1954, 1955, 1958
