= Athletics at the 1959 Pan American Games – Women's javelin throw =

Women's javelin throw at the Pan American Games

The women's javelin throw event at the 1959 Pan American Games was held at the Soldier Field in Chicago on 28 August.

== Results ==
Rank	Name	Nationality	Result	Notes
1st place, gold medalist(s)	Marlene Ahrens	Chile	45.38	
2nd place, silver medalist(s)	Marjorie Larney	United States	43.65	
3rd place, bronze medalist(s)	Amelia Wood	United States	42.96	
4	Margaret Scholler	United States	39.90	
5	Adriana Silva	Chile	39.06	
6	Silvia Hunte	Panama	33.33	
	Shirley Topley	Canada	DNS	
	Bertha Chiú	Mexico	DNS	
