= Alevtina Shastitko =

Soviet javelin thrower

Personal information
- Nationality: Soviet
- Born: 22 April 1939 (age 87) Leningrad, Russian SFSR, Soviet Union

Sport
- Sport: Athletics
- Event: Javelin throw
Medal record
Women's athletics
Representing Soviet Union
European Championships
Bronze medal – third place	1962 Belgrade	Javelin throw

Alevtina Shastitko (Russian: Алевтина Шаститко; born 22 April 1939) is a Soviet athlete. She competed in the women's javelin throw at the 1960 Summer Olympics.
