= Erika Raue =

German javelin thrower (1938–2023)

Personal information
- Nationality: German
- Born: 1 May 1938 Leipzig, East Germany
- Died: 6 May 2023 (aged 85)

Sport
- Sport: Athletics
- Event: Javelin throw

Erika Raue (1 May 1938 – 6 May 2023) was a German athlete. She competed in the women's javelin throw at the 1956 Summer Olympics.
