= Junko Kubo =

Japanese television announcer

Junko Kubo (久保純子, Kubo Junko; born January 24, 1972) is a television presenter and announcer in Japan. Her nicknames are Kubojun and Junjun.

Born the daughter of two Nippon Television announcers, Junko spent four years in England during elementary school, and lived in the United States during her some of high-school years. She graduated from Keio University with a degree in English and American literature.

Her professional career began when she joined NHK in 1994. She was described as an "idol-announcer."

Junko has one child. She took child-rearing leave, and in 2002 returned as a contract employee. The contract expired in 2004, whereupon she became a freelance announcer.

== NHK career ==
When she was at NHK, Junko was the sports presenter on NHK News 11 and NHK News Ohayō Nippon (NHK News Good Morning Japan). She emceed the music show Pop Jam and served as narrator for the asadora and Watashi no Aozora. She hosted Project X: Chōsensha-tachi and the quiz show Otakara Eizō Quiz: Mireba Nattoku. On the nature program Chikyū! Fushigi Daishizen she was not only the narrator, but also hosted in rotation with two other presenters. Three times (1998, 1999, and 2000) she served as leader of the Red Team on the New Year's Eve spectacular, Kōhaku Uta Gassen. Junko was the assistant host of Yume Miru Tamago, a series of irregularly scheduled programs. On Terebi Ehon, Junko was the narrator.

== Freelance career ==
Junko co-anchored the Tokyo Broadcasting System's coverage of the 2004 Summer Olympics in Athens. She then joined the team of Broadcaster, broadcast nationwide on the same network late on Saturday nights. Beginning in January 2006, she has hosted Kubo Junko no Lion Music Saturday on Nippon Cultural Broadcasting radio. Since April 2007, Junko has co-hosted the Fuji Television show Uchikuru!?.

Additionally, Junko has numerous guest appearances, commercials, and drama guest-starring roles to her credit. She has also written two books: a collection of essays and a guide to New York.
