= Urszula Figwer =

Polish javelin thrower (1931–2025)

Personal information
- Nationality: Polish
- Born: 25 April 1931 Inwałd, Poland
- Died: 21 April 2025 (aged 93) Kraków, Poland
- Height: 1.64 m (5 ft 5 in)
- Weight: 74 kg (163 lb)

Sport
- Sport: Athletics, volleyball
- Event: Javelin throw
Medal record
Representing Poland
Summer Universiade
Silver medal – second place	1959 Turin	Javelin throw

Urszula Figwer (25 April 1931 – 21 April 2025) was a Polish javelin thrower and volleyball player. She was born in Inwałd. She competed at the 1956 Summer Olympics in Melbourne, where she placed sixth position in women's javelin throw. She also competed at the 1960 Summer Olympics in Rome, where she placed fifth in women's javelin throw.

Figwer died on 21 April 2025, at the age of 93.

== International competitions ==
Year	Competition	Venue	Position	Event	Notes
Representing Poland
1956	Olympic Games	Melbourne, Australia	6th	Javelin throw	48.16 m
1957	World University Games	Paris, France	4th	Javelin throw	49.30 m
1958	European Championships	Stockholm, Sweden	6th	Javelin throw	49.48 m
1959	Universiade	Turin, Italy	4th	shot put	13.01 m
1959	Universiade	Turin, Italy	2nd	Javelin throw	47.02 m
1960	Olympic Games	Rome, Italy	5th	Javelin throw	52.33 m

== Personal bests ==
- Shot put – 13.83 (Zabrze 1960)
- Discus throw – 41.85 (Kraków 1965)
- Javelin throw – 57.77 (Koblenz 1960)
