= Rosemarie Schubert =

German javelin thrower

Personal information
- Nationality: German
- Born: 7 November 1943 (age 81) Breslau, Germany

Sport
- Sport: Athletics
- Event: Javelin throw

Rosemarie Schubert (born 7 November 1943) is a German athlete. She competed in the women's javelin throw at the 1964 Summer Olympics.
