= Rosanna Zambon =

Italian singer (born 1950)

- Born: Schio, Italy
- Genres: Kayōkyoku, Bossa Nova
- Occupations: Singer, musician (Japanese)
- Years active: 1968-1990
- Labels: Nippon Columbia, Warner Music Japan

Rosanna Zambon (born July 3, 1950, in Schio, Italy) is an Italian singer.

== Biography ==
She is best known for her work in Japan with the duo Hide & Rosanna. She subsequently became a TV personality with her own Italian cuisine show.

== Discography ==
- 粋なうわさ A PRETTY RUMOR/橋本淳･筒美京平ゴールデン･アルバム (stylish rumor A PRETTY RUMOR / love of color of tears) Hashimoto Atsushi Kyohei Tsutsumi Golden Album (1969.7.10, JPS-5182) * newly recorded song (cover of Chiyo Okumura)
- イタリーの休日 (holiday of Italy) (1969.11.25, JDX-32)
- デュエット／ヒデとロザンナの世界 (DUET! DUET! DUET! world of Rosanna and Hiden duet) (1971.11.10, JDX-57)
- 愛の伝説 (legend of love) (1972.06.25, JDX-75)
- 旅の宿 (inn of travel BEST SELECTIONS OF HIDE & ROSSANNA) (1970.12.25, JDX-46)
- 追想 (retrospect) (1975, L-10094R)
- WALKING AGAIN (1977, L-10066R)
- 愛のハーモニー (Harmony of Love) (1979, DVR-11001)
- 愛はいつまでも (love forever) (1989/5/25, 29L2-74)

== Selected Songs ==
- 愛の奇跡 (Miracle of love) (1968.10.15, P-42)
- 粋なうわさ (Stylish rumor) (1969.4.15, P-58)
- ローマの奇跡 (Miracle of Rome) (1969.8.25, P-74)
- 笑ってごらん子供のように (As you can see children laughing) (1970.1.25, P-83)
- 愛は傷つきやすく (Love is vulnerable) (1970.5.25, P-93)

== Kōhaku Uta Gassen Appearances ==
Year	#	Song	No.	VS	Remarks
1970 (Showa 45)/21st	1	Ai Wa Kitsukiyasuku (愛は傷つきやすく)	11/24	Toi et Moi	Participated with Demon Hide as 'Hide and Rosanna', under White team.
1971 (Showa 46)/22nd	2	Nozomu Monowasubete (望むものはすべて)	14/25	Izumi Yukimura	Participated with Demon Hide as 'Hide and Rosanna', under White team.
