= Erzsébet Vígh =

Hungarian athlete (born 1935)

Personal information
- Nationality: Hungarian
- Born: 27 February 1935 (age 91) Timișoara, Romania

Sport
- Sport: Athletics
- Event: Javelin throw

Achievements and titles
- Olympic finals: 1956 Summer Olympics

Erzsébet Vígh (born 27 February 1935) is a Hungarian athlete. She competed in the women's javelin throw at the 1956 Summer Olympics.
