= Kaisa Parviainen =

Finnish athlete (1914–2002)

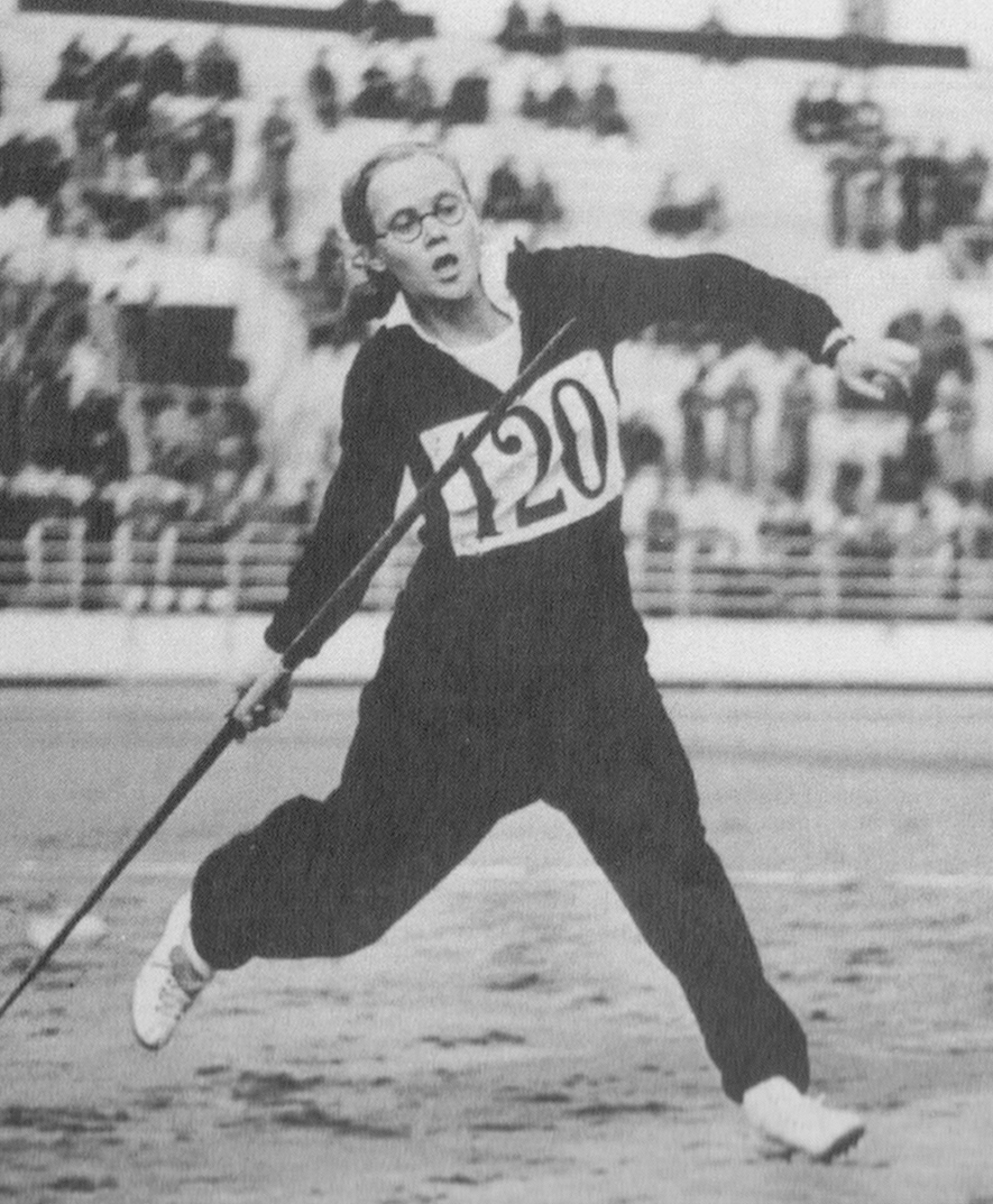

Personal information
- Born: 3 December 1914 Muuruvesi, Finland
- Died: 21 October 2002 (aged 87) Rauma, Finland

Sport
- Sport: Athletics
- Events: Javelin throw, discus throw, long jump
- Club: Varku Urheilijat

Achievements and titles
- Personal bests: JT – 43.79 m (1948); DT – 38.02 m (1939); LJ – 5.48 m (1948)
Medal record
Representing Finland
Olympic Games
Silver medal – second place	1948 London	Javelin throw

Katri "Kaisa" Vellamo Parviainen (3 December 1914 – 21 October 2002) was a Finnish athlete. She competed in the javelin throw at the 1948 and 1952 Olympics and won a silver medal in 1948, finishing 16th in 1952; in 1948 she also placed 13th in the long jump.
