= Inwałd =

- Village
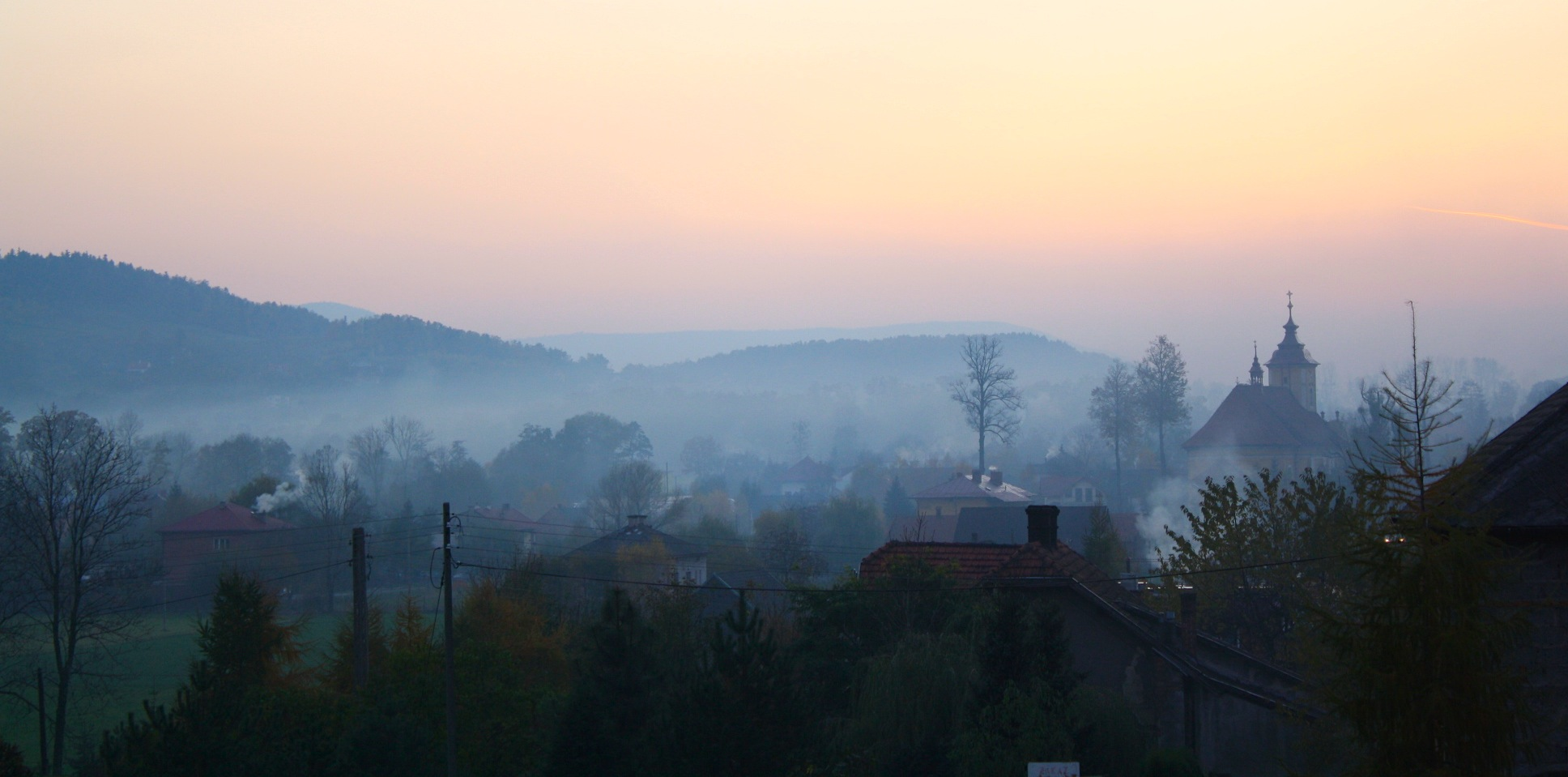
- Inwałd

- Location within Poland
- Coordinates: 49°51′50″N 19°23′52″E
- Country: Poland
- Voivodeship: Lesser Poland
- County: Wadowice
- Gmina: Andrychów
- First mentioned: 1317
- Population: 3,202

Inwałd [ˈinvau̯t] is a village in the administrative district of Gmina Andrychów, within Wadowice County, Lesser Poland Voivodeship, in southern Poland.

The village was first mentioned in 1317 as Hoyenewaldt and later as Helwand (1326), Henwald (1346), Hynwald (1430), Huwalth (1529), Inwald (1581).
