= John Ken Nuzzo =

Japanese-born American tenor (born 1966)

- ジョン・健・ヌッツォ
- Born: Tokyo, Japan
- Education: Chapman University
- Occupation: Singer (tenor)
- Website: jkn-tenorissimo.com

John Ken Nuzzo (Japanese: ジョン・健・ヌッツォ) is an American tenor of Japanese origin.

== Biography ==
Nuzzo was born in Tokyo on 5 May 1966 to a Japanese mother and an American-Italian father. Nuzzo was involved in theater in middle school and attended an international high school. While in high school, the school's music teacher Don Campbell, who would later go on to write the musical therapy book The Mozart Effect, urged him to join the Boy's Chorus.

After high school, Nuzzo moved to the United States and attended Chapman University in California. Despite initially enrolling as a business major, Nuzzo became interested in a career in music during his third year.

In 1997, he won first prize in the Japan Vocal Competition, a Japanese singing competition. The following year, he won the Japan round of the International Hans Gabor Belvedere Singing Competition in Vienna, which led to an opportunity to perform with the Vienna State Opera.

In 2011, he sang in Giacomo Puccini's La bohème at the Anchorage Opera House. In March of that year, the 2011 Tōhoku earthquake and ensuing tsunami struck Japan. Nuzzo was drafted by TV stations to provide voice recordings for transit systems after the disaster.

== Awards ==
- 1985 – Alitalia International Singing Competition, 2nd place.
- 1992 – Los Angeles Young Artists Vocal Competition, 1st place; Los Angeles Opera Guild Competition, 1st place
- Palm Springs Opera Guild Competition, 3rd place; Pasadena Opera Guild Competition, 1st place; Riverside Opera Guild Competition, 1st place.
- Whittier Chorus Competition, 2nd place; Opera 100 Competition, 1st place; S.A.I. Vocal Competition, 1st place; Orange County Musical Arts Competition, 1st Place.
- 1993 – NATS "Los Angeles Artist of the Year"
- 1997 – Japan Vocal Competition, 1st place.
- 1998 – International Hans Gabor Belvedere Singing Competition Japan, Winner.
- 2001 – Eberhard Waechter Gesangs medallion Austria 2001, Winner.
- 2003 – Japan Idemitsu Music Award 2003, Winner

== Discography (CD) ==
- Franz Schubert: 11 selected songs from “Die schöne Müllerin, Op.25, D.795” - Fontec
- NUZZO meets PUCCINI - Fontec
- Rare Live Track 2020 - Fontec
- BEETHOVEN×SCHUBERT - Fontec
- Serenata(Italian Art Songs) -Fontec
- “DICHTERLIEBE Op.48” -Fontec
- NUZZO JAZZ _
- Italian Aria – Fontec
- Tenorissimo – Universal Classics & Jazz
- NHK Taiga Historical Drama Shinsengumi! Original Soundtrack- Universal Classics & Jazz
- Treasure Voice – Universal Classics & Jazz
- Petr Turrini/Friedrich Cerha [Der Riese Vom Stenfeld]- ORF
- Zemlinsky [DER KONIG KANDAULES] Salzburg Festival 2002 -Andante
- Benjamin Britten [Billy Budd] - Orfeo d'or

== Discography (DVD) ==
- Shigaki Saegusa [KAMIKAZE] - Sony Music Japan International
- Giuseppe Verdi [SIMON BOCCANEGRA] - ORF
