= Ingeborg Schwalbe =

German javelin thrower

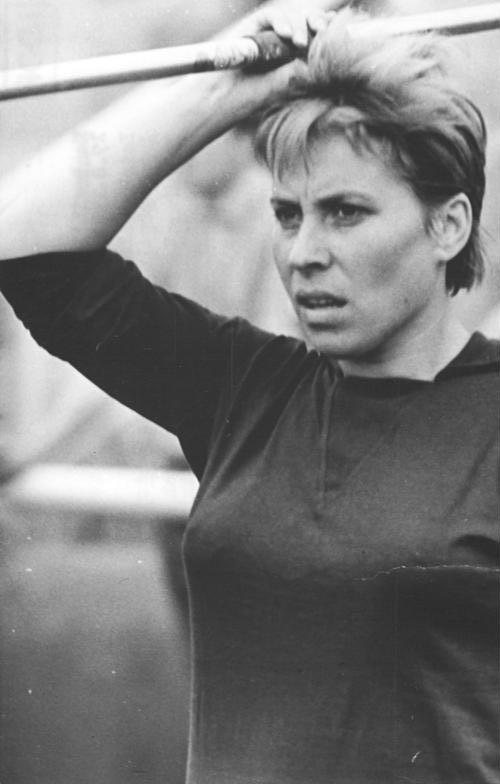
- Ingeborg Schwalbe in 1964

Personal information
- Nationality: German
- Born: 21 November 1935 (age 91) Bernsdorf, Upper Lusatia, Germany

Sport
- Sport: Athletics
- Event: Javelin throw

Ingeburg (Inge) Schwalbe (born 21 November 1935 ) is a German former athlete. She competed in the women's javelin throw at the 1964 Summer Olympics.
