= Dana Zátopková =

Czech javelin thrower (1922–2020)

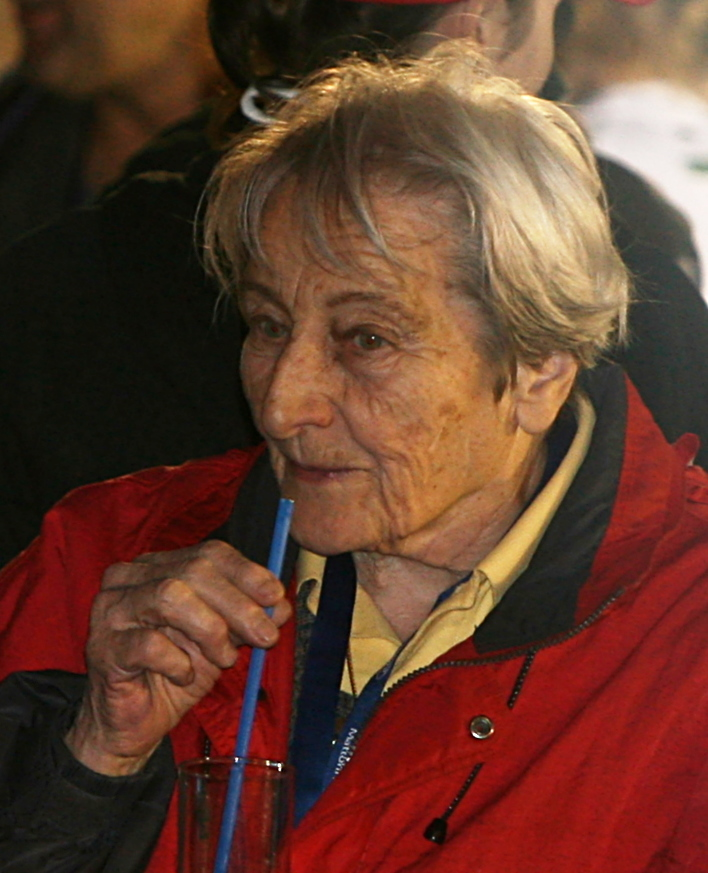
- Zátopková in 2007

Personal information
- Born: 19 September 1922 Fryštát, Czechoslovakia
- Died: 13 March 2020 (aged 97) Prague, Czech Republic
Medal record
Women's athletics
Representing Czechoslovakia
Olympic Games
Gold medal – first place	1952 Helsinki	Javelin throw
Silver medal – second place	1960 Rome	Javelin throw
European Championships
Gold medal – first place	1954 Bern	Javelin throw
Gold medal – first place	1958 Stockholm	Javelin throw

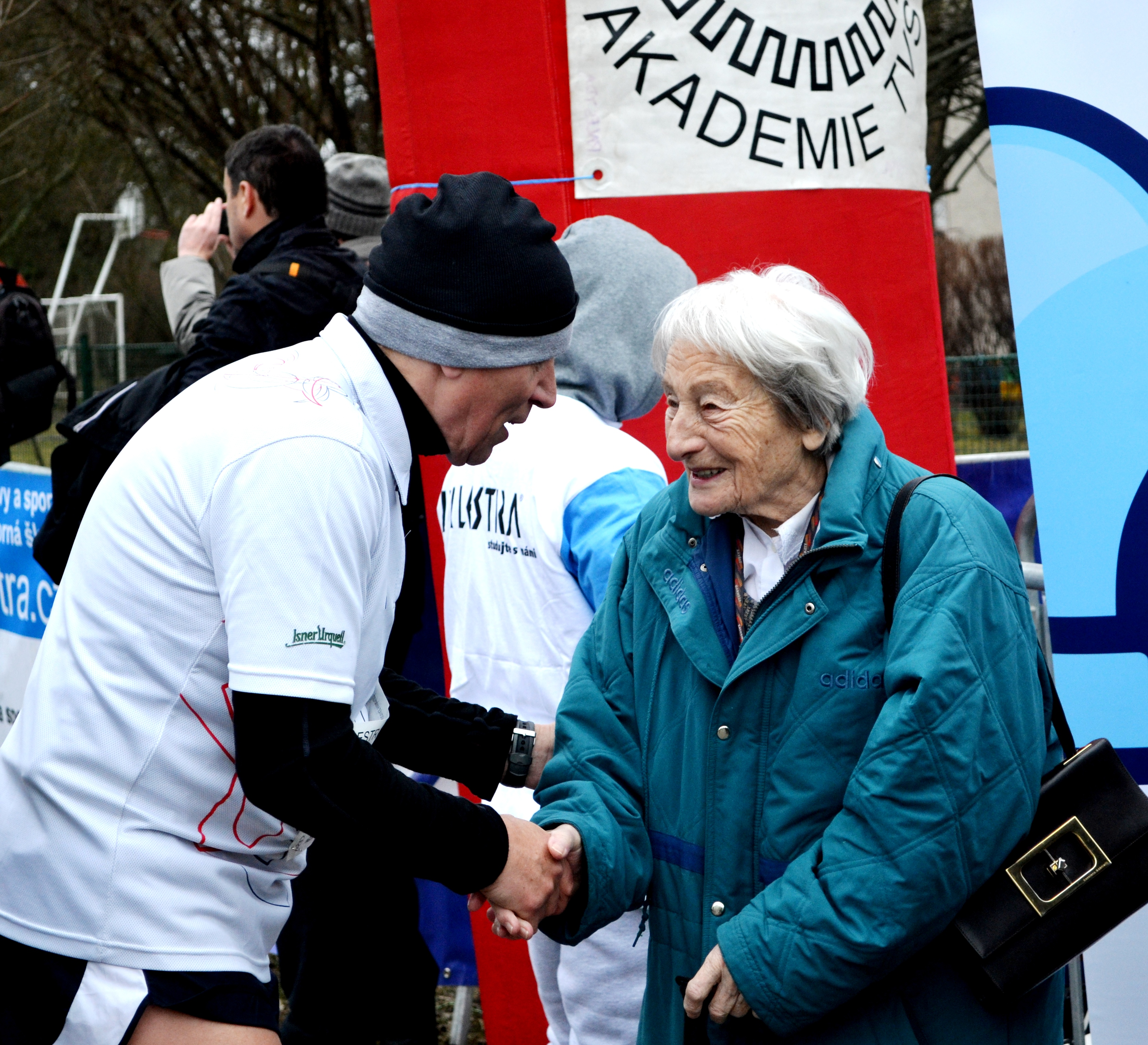
Dana Zátopková (2014)

Dana Zátopková (Czech pronunciation: [ˈdana ˈzaːtopkovaː]; née Ingrová [ˈɪŋɡrovaː], 19 September 1922 – 13 March 2020) was a Czech javelin thrower who won a gold medal at the 1952 Summer Olympics.

== Biography ==
At the 1952 Olympic Games, she won the gold medal in the javelin throw event at the 1952 Summer Olympics (only an hour after her husband, Emil Zátopek, won the 5,000 m), and the silver medal in the 1960 Summer Olympics. She was the European champion in 1954 and 1958.

On 1 June 1958, she became the oldest woman in the sport of athletics to break a world record, aged 35 years, 255 days, when she threw 55.73 metres.

Zátopková and her husband were the witnesses at the wedding ceremony of Olympic gold medalists Olga Fikotová and Harold Connolly in Prague in 1957. Emil spoke to the Czechoslovak president Antonín Zápotocký to request help in Olga getting a permit to marry Connolly. While it is not clear how much this helped, they did receive a permit a few days later.

== Achievements ==
Year	Competition	Venue	Position	Notes
Representing Czechoslovakia
1948	Olympic Games	London, United Kingdom	7th	39.94 m
1950	European Championships	Brussels, Belgium	5th	41.34 m
1952	Olympic Games	Helsinki, Finland	1st	50.47 m
1954	European Championships	Bern, Switzerland	1st	52.91 m
1956	Olympic Games	Melbourne, Australia	4th	49.83 m
1958	European Championships	Stockholm, Sweden	1st	56.02 m
1960	Olympic Games	Rome, Italy	2nd	53.78 m
