= Elsa Torikka =

Finnish javelin thrower

Personal information
- Nationality: Finnish
- Born: 19 December 1930 (age 95) Jaala, Finland

Sport
- Sport: Athletics
- Event: Javelin throw

Elsa Backus (née Torikka; born 19 December 1930) is a Finnish athlete. She competed in the women's javelin throw at the 1952 Summer Olympics. Torikka was married to American hammer thrower Bob Backus, whom she had met in Helsinki in 1956. She became a U.S. citizen in 1961.
