= Jutta Krüger =

German javelin thrower (born 1932)

Personal information
- Full name: Judith Krüger
- Nationality: German
- Born: 22 August 1932 Berlin, Germany

Sport
- Sport: Athletics
- Event: Javelin throw
Medal record
Women's athletics
Representing West Germany
European Championships
Bronze medal – third place	1958 Stockholm	Javelin throw

Jutta Krüger (born 22 August 1932) is a German athlete. She competed in the women's javelin throw at the 1952 Summer Olympics.
