= Yoriko Mekata =

Japanese television announcer for NHK (born 1960)

Yoriko Mekata (目加田 頼子, Mekata Yoriko) (born March 30, 1960) is a Japanese television announcer for NHK.

== Biography ==
Mekata is from Shizuoka Prefecture, but spent several years in Argentina and Canada, and graduated from Quesnel Senior Secondary School in Canada. She graduated from Sophia University in Tokyo, and joined the staff of NHK. Her initial assignment was in Tokyo. She also served in Osaka and Sapporo, and now works in Tokyo. With Yuki Saitō, Mekata was the co-hostess for the Red Team in the New Year's Eve Kōhaku Uta Gassen spectacular in 1986. From 1987 to 1988, she and Kazuyuki Yamamoto anchored the late-night news program NHK Night Wide, and from 1988 to 1990 delivered the weather forecasts on the prime-time NHK News Today. More recently, she has hosted the cooking program Kyō no Ryōri (the longest-running program currently on Japanese television) and on NHK's educational network the crafts program Oshare Kōbō. In 2006, she is active on the television gardening program Shumi no Engei and the Saturday night radio program Doyō no Yoru wa Keitai Tanka.
