= Vlasta Pešková =

Czech javelin thrower

Personal information
- Nationality: Czech
- Born: 11 April 1938 (age 88) Příbram, Czechoslovakia

Sport
- Sport: Athletics
- Event: Javelin throw

Vlasta Pešková (born 11 April 1938) is a Czech athlete. She competed in the women's javelin throw at the 1960 Summer Olympics.
