= Lee Hye-ja =

South Korean javelin thrower (born 1947)

Personal information
- Nationality: South Korean
- Born: 14 February 1947 (age 79)

Sport
- Sport: Athletics
- Event: Javelin throw

Lee Hye-ja (born 14 February 1947) is a South Korean athlete. She competed in the women's javelin throw at the 1964 Summer Olympics.
