= Jo Teunissen-Waalboer =

Dutch javelin thrower

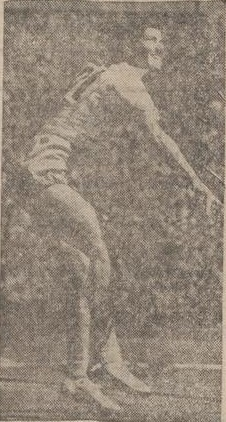
- Waalboer at the 1948 Summer Olympics

Personal information
- Born: 25 May 1919 Velp, Gelderland, the Netherlands
- Died: 3 April 1991 (aged 71) Velp, Gelderland, the Netherlands

Sport
- Sport: Javelin throw
- Club: UDI, Arnhem

Johanna Elizabeth Teunissen-Waalboer (25 May 1919 – 3 April 1991) was a Dutch javelin thrower. She competed at the 1948 Summer Olympics and finished in fifth place.
