= Márta Rudas =

Hungarian javelin thrower

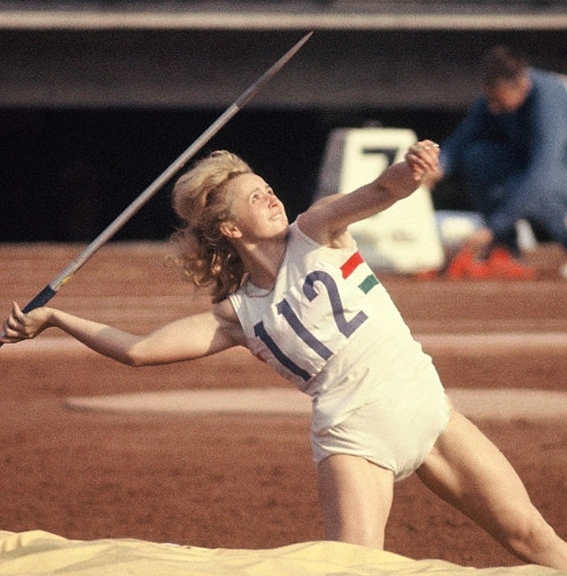
- Rudas at the 1964 Olympics

Personal information
- Born: Márta Antal; 14 February 1937 Debrecen, Hungary
- Died: 6 June 2017 (aged 80) Budapest, Hungary
- Height: 1.64 m (5 ft 5 in)
- Weight: 66 kg (146 lb)
- Spouse: Ferenc Rudas

Sport
- Sport: Athletics
- Event: Javelin throw
- Club: Vasas, Budapest

Achievements and titles
- Personal best: 58.36 m (1965)
Medal record
Women's athletics
Representing Hungary
Olympic Games
Silver medal – second place	1964 Tokyo	Javelin throw

Márta Rudas (née Antal, 14 February 1937 – 6 June 2017) was a Hungarian javelin thrower. She competed at the 1960, 1964 and 1968 Olympics and finished in ninth, second and fourth place, respectively.

She was married to Hungarian association football player Ferenc Rudas.
