= Yoriko Shida =

Japanese javelin thrower (born 1935)

Personal information
- Nationality: Japanese
- Born: 28 July 1935 (age 90) Ichinomiya, Chiba, Japan

Sport
- Sport: Athletics
- Event: Javelin throw
Medal record
Representing Japan
Asian Games
Gold medal – first place	1958 Tokyo	Javelin throw

Yoriko Shida (志田 順子, Shida Yoriko; born 28 July 1935) is a Japanese track and field athlete. She competed in the women's javelin throw at the 1956 Summer Olympics.
