= Lily Carlstedt =

Danish javelin thrower (1926–2002)

Olympic medal record

Women's athletics

Representing Denmark
Bronze medal – third place	1948 London	Javelin throw

Lily Marie Louise Carlstedt, later Kelsby (March 5, 1926 in Søllerød – June 14, 2002), was a Danish athlete who competed mainly in javelin throwing.

She competed for Denmark in the 1948 Summer Olympics held in London, where she won a bronze medal in javelin and in the 1952 Summer Olympics held in Helsinki, where she beat the Olympic Record.
