= Karen Anderson (athlete) =

American javelin thrower (born 1938)

Personal information
- Born: April 5, 1938 (age 88) Denver, Colorado, U.S.
- Education: University of Pennsylvania
- Height: 165 cm (5 ft 5 in)
- Weight: 53 kg (117 lb)

Sport
- Sport: Athletics
- Event: Javelin throw
- Club: SDTC, San Diego

Achievements and titles
- Personal best: 50.62 (1960)
Medal record
Representing United States
Pan American Games
Gold medal – first place	1955 Mexico City	Javelin throw

Karen Linnea Anderson (married Oldham; born April 5, 1938) is an American retired javelin thrower who won a gold medal at the 1955 Pan American Games and set four national records, in 1955, 1956, and twice in 1960. She competed at the 1956 and 1960 Summer Olympics and finished in 8th and 13th place, respectively.

After marrying Ned Oldham, an Akron attorney, she moved to Akron, where she worked with developmentally disabled children, and was involved with athletics programs and a Presbyterian Church. She also became a leading American senior golfer, finishing third at the 1995 national championships and tying for second place in 1996. In 1996 she was part of the American team that won the Senior Women's International Team Championships.
