= Yelena Gorchakova =

Soviet javelin thrower

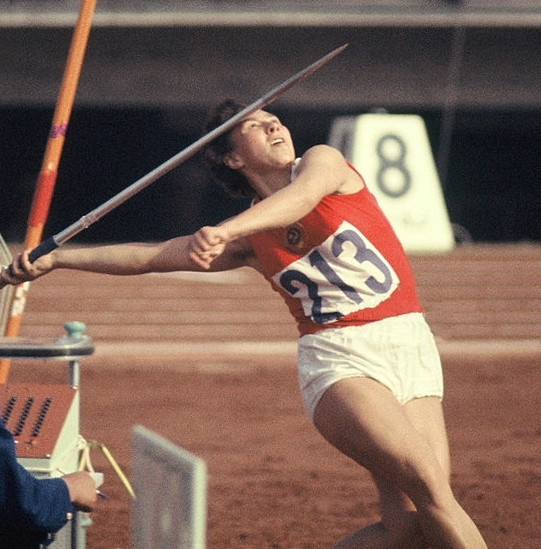
- Yelena Gorchakova at the 1964 Olympics

Personal information
- Born: 17 May 1933 Moscow, Russian SFSR, Soviet Union
- Died: 27 January 2002 (aged 68) Moscow, Russia

Sport
- Sport: Javelin throw
- Club: Burevestnik Moscow

Achievements and titles
- Personal best: 62.40 m (1964)
Medal record
Representing the Soviet Union
Olympic Games
Bronze medal – third place	1952 Helsinki	Javelin throw
Bronze medal – third place	1964 Tokyo	Javelin throw
Universiade
Gold medal – first place	1961 Sofia	Javelin throw

Yelena Yegorovna Gorchakova (Russian: Елена Егоровна Горчакова; 17 May 1933 – 27 January 2002) was a Russian javelin thrower who won bronze medals at the 1952 and 1964 Olympics. Her 1964 bronze was a disappointment as she set a world record in the qualification that remained unbeaten for eight years.

During her long career Gorchakova had a fierce competition within the Soviet national team and won the national title only twice, in 1963 and 1965. As a result, despite being a world's top thrower she rarely competed internationally. Gorchakova won the javelin event at the 1961 Summer Universiade and finished fourth at the 1966 European Championships. She retired shortly thereafter.
