= Inese Jaunzeme =

Latvian javelin thrower

Personal information
- Born: 21 May 1932 Pļaviņas, Latvia
- Died: 13 February 2011 (aged 78) Riga, Latvia
- Height: 169 cm (5 ft 7 in)
- Weight: 70 kg (154 lb)

Sport
- Sport: Athletics
- Event: Javelin throw
- Club: Dynamo Riga

Achievements and titles
- Personal best: 55.73 (1960)
Medal record
Representing the Soviet Union
Olympic Games
Gold medal – first place	1956 Melbourne	Javelin throw

Inese Jaunzeme (21 May 1932 – 13 February 2011) was a Latvian javelin thrower who won a gold medal at the 1956 Olympics.

Jaunzeme placed third at the Soviet Union Championships in 1956, earning herself a place on the Soviet Olympic team for the 1956 Olympics. She set an Olympic record in the first round of the event and went on to improve her mark twice more, ending up with a winning throw of 53.86 metres. This made her the first Latvian Olympic champion. She was awarded the Order of the Red Banner of Labour in 1957 in recognition of her achievement and was selected as the Latvian athlete of the year in 1956 and 1957.

Jaunzeme was the Latvian champion in the javelin in 1952, 1956, 1958 and 1960, and placed second at the 1957 World University Games. In 1960, she graduated from the Riga Medical Institute and retired from competitions. She worked in the fields of traumatology and plastic surgery, and defended a PhD in 1969. Since 1970 she was an orthopedics professor at the Riga Medical Institute. From 1999 until her death in 2011 she headed the Latvian Olympians Association.

A street in Riga (Ineses Jaunzemes iela) was named after her in August 2023.
