= Birutė Kalėdienė =

Lithuanian javelin thrower

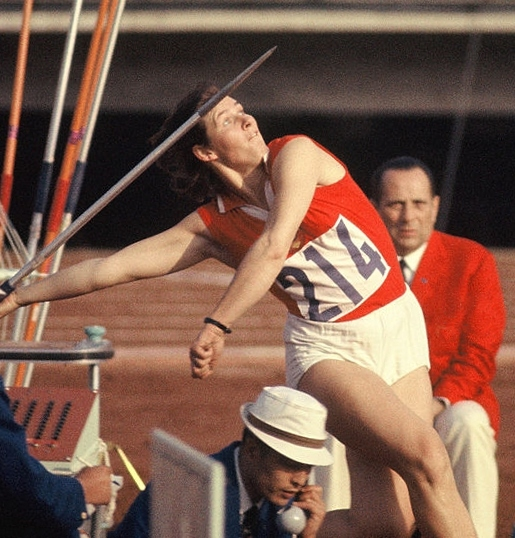
- Birutė Kalėdienė at the 1964 Olympics

Personal information
- Native name: Birute Viktorovna Kaledene (Zalogaytite-); Бируте Викторовна Каледене (Залогайтите-)
- Born: 2 November 1934 (age 91) Baltrušiai, Lithuania
- Height: 1.73 m (5 ft 8 in)
- Weight: 77 kg (170 lb)

Sport
- Sport: Javelin throw
- Club: Žalgiris, Kaunas

Achievements and titles
- Personal best: 57.49 m (1958)
Medal record
Women's athletics
Representing Soviet Union
Olympic Games
Bronze medal – third place	1960 Rome	Javelin throw
European Championships
Silver medal – second place	1958 Stockholm	Javelin throw

Birutė Kalėdienė (née Zalogaitytė, Russian: Бируте Викторовна Каледене; born 2 November 1934, Baltrušiai, Marijampolė County) is a retired Lithuanian javelin thrower who won a silver medal for the Soviet Union at the 1958 European Championships. She competed at the 1960 and 1964 Olympics and finished in third and fourth place, respectively.

== Life ==
Kalėdienė was born in Lithuania in 1934. She started training to throw javelin in 1952 and won the Soviet titles in 1958–60. In 1958 she became the first Lithuanian athlete to set a world record (57.49 m) and was selected as the Lithuanian athlete of the year.

Kalėdienė retired in 1966 to work as a coach in Kaunas. She was a board member of Ąžuolyno Kaunas sports club and continued to compete in the masters category. In 2005, she won a world title in the F70 (Masters) category.

In 2006 she made a Javelin throw of 30m 54 cm as a masters woman in her weight category. In 2017 it was the third longest throw of all time.
