= Elvīra Ozoliņa =

Soviet javelin thrower

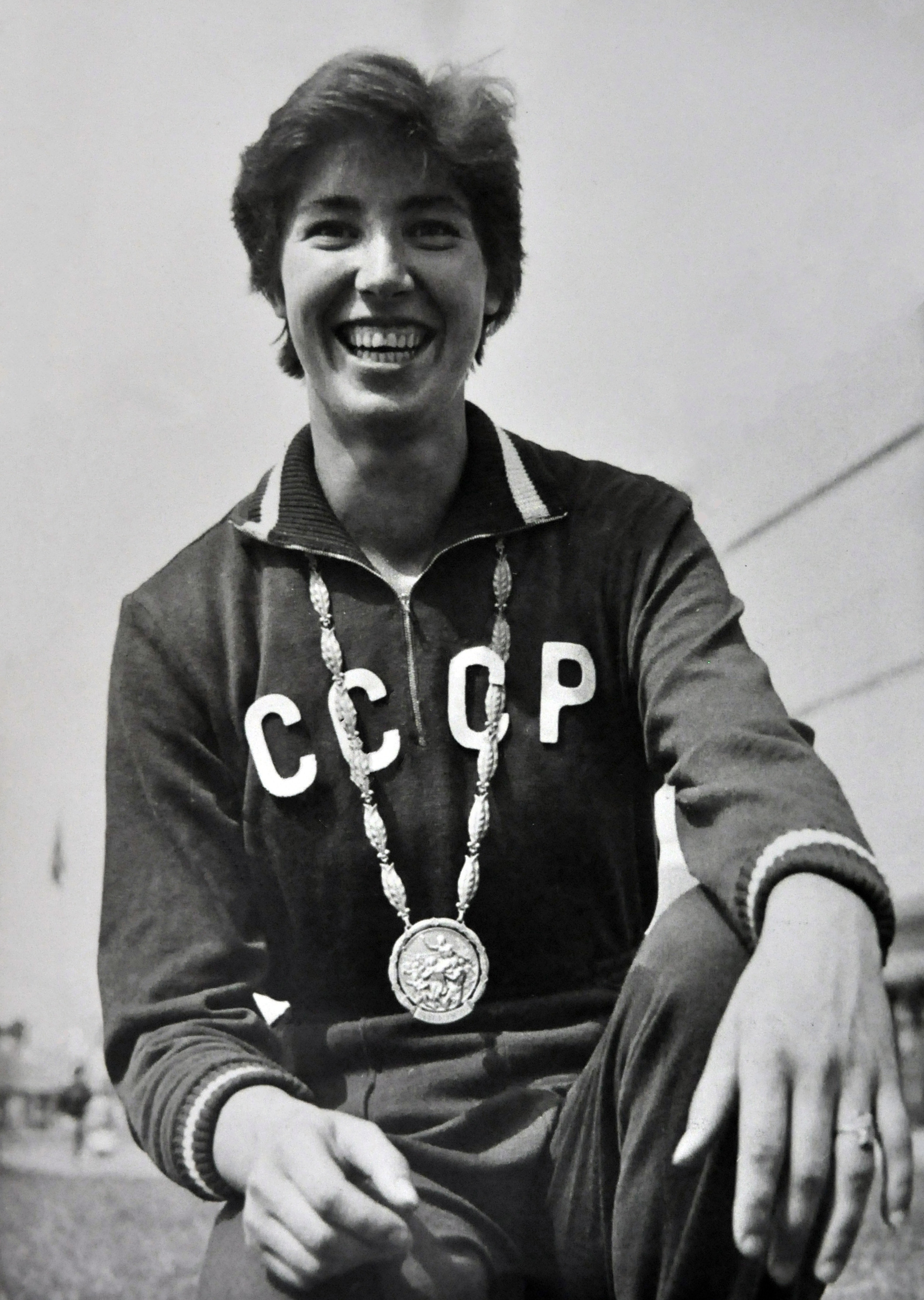
- Ozoliņa at the 1960 Olympics

Personal information
- Full name: Elvīra Anatoļjevna Ozoliņa
- Born: 8 October 1939 (age 86) Leningrad, RSFSR, Soviet Union
- Height: 1.76 m (5 ft 9 in)
- Weight: 67 kg (148 lb)

Sport
- Sport: Javelin throw
- Club: Burevestnik, Saint Petersburg
Medal record
Women's athletics
Representing the Soviet Union
Olympic Games
Gold medal – first place	1960 Rome	Javelin throw
European Championships
Gold medal – first place	1962 Belgrade	Javelin throw
Universiade
Gold medal – first place	1959 Torino	Javelin throw

Elvīra Anatoļjevna Ozoliņa (Russian: Эльвира Анатольевна Озолина, born 8 October 1939) is a retired Soviet javelin thrower. In 1960 she won gold medal with an Olympic Record of 55.98 m and was awarded the Order of the Red Banner of Labour. Between 1960 and 1963 she set three world records. In 1964 she became the first woman to surpass 60 m (61.38 m, at Soviet Championships), but this result was not ratified as a world record by IAAF. In the 1964 Olympic final she fouled her last four attempts and finished in a disappointing fifth place. Domestically she won the national title in 1959, 1961–62, 1964, 1966, and 1973.

In 1969, Ozoliņa married Jānis Lūsis (1939–2020), the 1968 Olympic champion in men's javelin throw. Their son, Voldemārs Lūsis, competed in the same event for Latvia at the 2000 Summer Olympics and 2004 Summer Olympics.
