= Ingrid Almqvist =

Swedish javelin thrower

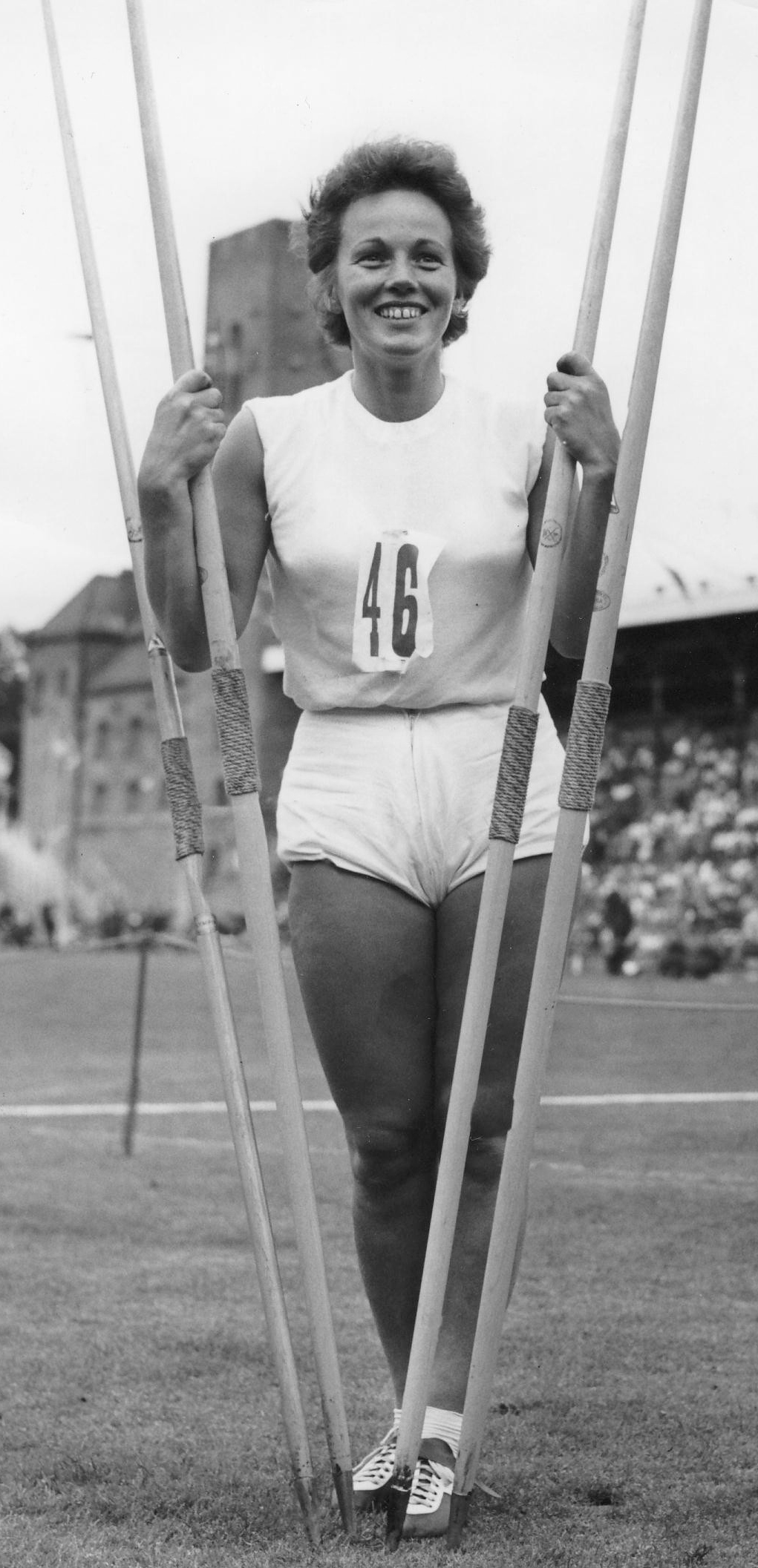

Personal information
- Nickname: Ingrid Almqvist
- Born: 10 October 1927 Gothenburg, Sweden
- Died: 9 November 2017 (aged 90)
- Height: 1.62 m (5 ft 4 in)
- Weight: 57 kg (126 lb)

Sport
- Sport: Athletics
- Event: Javelin throw
- Club: Redbergslids IK, Göteborg; GKIK, Göteborg

Achievements and titles
- Personal best: 52.32 m (1964)

Ingrid Margareta Almqvist (10 October 1927 – 9 November 2017) was a Swedish javelin thrower. She competed at the 1948, 1956 and 1960 Summer Olympics and finished in 10th, 5th and 14th place, respectively. She placed 8th–10th at the European championships of 1950–1958. Almqvist won 15 Swedish javelin titles in 1947, 1949–52 and 1954–64. In addition to athletics, she played 11 international handball matches for Sweden and competed nationally in fencing.
