= Yamamura =

Yamamura (written: 山村 literally "mountain village") is a Japanese surname. Notable people with the surname include:

- Akira Yamamura (山村 彰; 1936–2005), Japanese sailor
- Bochō Yamamura (山村 暮鳥; 1884–1924), Japanese writer, poet and songwriter
- Gashō Yamamura (山村 雅昭; 1939–1987), Japanese photographer
- Hajime Yamamura, Japanese manga artist and author of Kamunagara
- Hibiku Yamamura (山村 響; born 1988), Japanese voice actress and singer
- Hiroki Yamamura (山村 洋貴; born 1981), Japanese animator
- Hiroshi Yamamura (山村 浩; born 1962), Japanese naval officer
- Hiroshi V. Yamamura, Marshallese politician
- Hiroto Yamamura (山村 博土; born 1974), Japanese footballer
- Kazuya Yamamura (山村 和也; born 1989), Japanese footballer
- Ken Yamamura (山村 憲之介; born 1986), Japanese actor
- Kōji Yamamura (山村 浩二; born 1964), Japanese animation director
- Kota Yamamura (山村 宏太; born 1989), Japanese volleyball player
- Malia Yamamura, 1984 winner of the Miss Hawaii Teen USA contest
- Michinao Yamamura (山村 路直; born 1978), Japanese baseball players
- Misa Yamamura (山村 美紗; 1934–1996), Japanese novelist
- Momiji Yamamura (山村 紅葉; born 1960), Japanese actress
- Ryō Yamamura (山村 亮; born 1981), Japanese rugby union player
- Ryuta Yamamura (born 1985), Flumpool vocalist
- Sakae Yamamura, 1982 winner of the IEEE Nikola Tesla Award
- Sō Yamamura (山村 聰; 1910–2000), Japanese actor
- Takahiko Yamamura (山村 貴彦; born 1970), Japanese sprinter
- Takehiro Yamamura (山村 武寛; born 1995), Japanese wrestler and producer
- Toshiyuki Yamamura (山村 敏之; born 1964), Japanese handball player
- Yuki Yamamura (山村 佑樹; born 1990), Japanese footballer
- Yukie Yamamura (山村 幸恵; born 1981), birth name of Kou Shibasaki, Japanese singer and actress
- Yasuhisa Yamamura (山村 康久; born 1964), Japanese video game designer for Nintendo
- Yasuhiro Yamamura (山村 泰弘; born 1976), Japanese footballer

== Fictional characters ==
- Mikan Yamamura, a character from UFO Baby (Japanese title, Daa! Daa! Daa!) series
- Sadako Yamamura, the antagonist in Koji Suzuki's novel the Ring and film the Ring
- Yamamura-sensei, a character from the Maria-sama ga Miteru series
- Misao Yamamura, a character from the anime and manga series of Case Closed
- Yamamura, a bird that appears in Super Mario Maker 2
