= Unreality =

Unreality can refer to:

- Derealization
- The opposite of reality
- Unreality (album), 2018 studio album by SRSQ
- Project Unreality, Nintendo 64 emulator

== See also ==
- Unreal (disambiguation)
