= List of Ajin: Demi-Human episodes =

Ajin: Demi-Human is a Japanese manga series written and illustrated by Gamon Sakurai. The opening theme song is "Can You Sleep at Night?" (夜は眠れるかい?, Yoru wa Nemureru kai?) by Flumpool, and the ending theme is "HOW CLOSE YOU ARE" by Mamoru Miyano. An anime series that follows the anime films premiered on January 16, 2016. (Note: The episode is listed for broadcast at 25:55 on January 15; this is the same as a broadcast time of 1:55 on January 16.) A second season premiered on October 8, 2016, and continued the original numbering sequence. The opening theme song from episodes 1 to 6 is "I am Who I am" (僕は僕であって, Boku wa Boku de Atte) by Angela X FripSide. The second opening theme song from episode 7 onwards is "The end of escape" by Angela X FripSide. The ending theme song is "At the Edge of the Schoolyard the Wind Blows, Can I Say That Now?" (校庭の隅に二人、風が吹いて今なら言えるかな, Kōtei no Sumi ni Futari, Kaze ga Fuite Ima Nara Ieru ka na) by CreepHyp. The anime series was debuted on Singapore Airlines's inflight entertainment.

== Episode list ==
=== Season 1 ===
No. overall	No. in season	Title	Original release date
1	1	"What's That Stuff Have to Do With Us?"; Transliteration: "Bokura ni wa Kankeinai Hanashi" (Japanese: 僕らには関係ない話)	January 16, 2016
Prologue: A gun battle takes place in Africa in which a single western soldier outguns many locals, no matter how many times he is killed. He is eventually felled by tranquilizer darts and removed in a U.S. Top Secret body bag. Later, in Japan, Kei Nagai is leaving school, lost in his thoughts, crossing the road, when he is hit and killed by a truck. Within moments, he begins to recover and discovers he is an immortal Ajin, the third in Japan. The bystanders and students realize it too and begin to see the opportunity to receive a large reward for his capture. In shock, Kei screams which immobilizes everyone, allowing him to escape. The police and Yu Tosaki of the government Ajin branch converge on the scene. Kei manages to meet up with Kaito, an old, trusted friend, and they flee on his motorcycle.
2	2	"Why is This Happening? Why Me..."; Transliteration: "Nande kon'na kotoni natta nda. Boku wa warukunainoni" (Japanese: 何でこんなことになったんだ。僕は悪くないのに)	January 23, 2016
Kaito takes Kei Nagai into the hills on his motorcycle. While stopping for fuel, Kei is recognised by two criminals in a van who have just abducted a schoolgirl. The criminals follow them and when the boys stop by the side of the road, the criminals attack. The leader pins down Kei and chokes him to death to see if he revives. As Kei loses consciousness a mummified figure or "Black Ghost" materializes nearby. Kei comes back to life and screams again, immobilizing everyone. Kaito recovers first and they flee again on the motorcycle, pursued shortly thereafter by the criminals, who are in turn followed by the Black Ghost. Meanwhile Yu Tosaki orders tranqilizer guns for the police as the best way to stop Ajin. Kaito and Kei manage to cross a railway line, but as the criminals cross the tracks behind them, the Black Ghost immobilizes the driver, and their van is destroyed by an oncoming train. The Black Ghost is heard repeating Kei's words.
3	3	"Maybe This is the End?"; Transliteration: "Mō Dame Janai ka na?" (Japanese: もうダメじゃないかな?)	January 30, 2016
Kaito and Kei are seen and pursued by another motorcyclist. Meanwhile Yu Tosaki recognises Sato, an Ajin hunter at the original accident scene. The other motorcyclist causes the boys to crash, but Kaito recovers and knocks him unconscious. Unfortunately Kei has a broken leg and cannot move. He uses the motorcyclist's knife to kill himself, and then fully recovers without injuries. Sato and Koji Tanaka discuss ways to find Kei Nagai. Kaito takes Kei to his retreat in the forest where he suggests that they to go to Kyushu. Kei sees the Black Ghost again. Yu Tosaki's assistant, Izumi Shimomura, questions Kei's sister Eriko who tells her of the time Kei saw a Black Ghost when their dog died. Suddenly a Black Ghost appears and kills Izumi Shimomura and the police officers before her eyes.
4	4	"Have You Ever Seen a Black Ghost?"; Transliteration: "Kimi wa Kuroi Yuurei o Mita Koto ga Aruka?" (Japanese: 君は黒い幽霊を見たことがあるか?)	February 6, 2016
Izumi Shimomura recovers and is revealed to be an Ajin. She uses her own Black Ghost to attack the one sent by Koji Tanaka that killed her. The Black Ghosts battle each other, with the one controlled by Izumi Shimomura eventually defeating the one controlled by Koji Tanaka. However, Sato abducts Eriko during the battle and tells her that he wants to help Kei. Kei decides that he should try to contact other Ajin who may be in hiding, but Sato contacts him first and they agree to meet. Kei leaves while Kaito is sleeping and meets Sato, but before Kei can decide whether to trust Sato, he is tranquilized. Sato decides that Kei is inexperienced and must be 'educated'.
5	5	"But When it Comes Down to It, You Still Want Them to Help You... You're the Worst Kind of Trash..."; Transliteration: "Iza to Nattara Tasuke o Motomeru Saitei na Kuzu" (Japanese: いざとなったら助けを求める最低なクズ)	February 13, 2016
Yu Tosaki and the police arrive and take Kei into custody. Sato reveals that it was his plot to have Kei captured by the government so that they would mistreat him and thus turn him against humans. The government surgeons begin experimenting on Kei in a sealed room. Under intense pain, his Black Ghost appears, but Kei resists using it to kill the surgeon. Sato and Tanaka mercilessly attack the installation, until Sato finally reaches Kei to free him. However, Sato discovers that Kei has not become the vengeful Ajin that he expected, and considers his strategy a failure.
6	6	"I'm Gonna Kill You Too"; Transliteration: "Kimi mo Buchikoroshite Yaru" (Japanese: 君もブチ殺してやる)	February 20, 2016
Sato suspects that something is different about Kei and when Sato starts to kill helpless surgeons, Kei objects and kills Sato. In the Ajin research centre, Ikuya Ogura tries to explain the Black Ghosts and Yu Tosaki insists that Izumi Shimomura stay by his side to protect him. Sato hunts Kei to kill him permanently, but Kei decides to help the surgeons escape and act as a decoy. He attacks Sato, but fails and as Sato is about to kill Kei, Kei's Black Ghost appears and kills Sato. As Kei and the remaining surgeon try to escape the installation, Sato again catches them, so Kei calls his Black Ghost but so does Sato. The Black Ghosts attack each other, and neither wins, but the distraction enables Kei to escape to the nearby river.
7	7	"I Swear I'll Cover the Whole Thing Up"; Transliteration: "Soshite Kanarazu Inpei Suru" (Japanese: そして必ず隠蔽する)	February 27, 2016
After losing the 'sample', Kei, Yu Tosaki receives a warning from the minister. He recalls the time when the minister offered him a position in the Ajin Control Commission and where he saw weapons being tested on Ajin 002 for potential profit. As Sato leaves the research complex, he addresses the media and uses them publicize the fact that the government conducts inhumane experiments on Ajin and to announce a public meeting—his strategy being to attract other Ajins to the event. At the event, Tanaka uses his Ajin skills to address only the Black Ghosts of the Ajin present to tell them of the real meeting place. Meanwhile Tosaki pursues his own agenda to get more information about the Ajin. He kidnaps the expert Ikuya Ogura and leaves a damaged body in his place. Later, he visits a hospital where his fiancé lies in a coma condition because she could not afford the high cost of her treatment.
8	8	"Brace Yourselves"; Transliteration: "Shōgeki ni Sonaero" (Japanese: 衝戟に備えろ)	March 5, 2016
Kei recovers from drowning in the ocean but then is run into by an old lady on a bicycle. He decides to stop and help her. Sato addresses the seven Ajin who attend his private meeting and gives them the option of joining him in a massacre. Those that do not, he plans to keep as captives. Three decide to join him, but four do not. Two are shot and two run, but only one young boy, Ko Nakano, escapes. Kei helps the old lady home, and although she realizes he is an Ajin, takes no action. Kei uses the opportunity to carry out some tests of his own to summon the Black Ghost. Nakano arrives home to find armed men sent by Tosaki to capture him. Before he is caught, an ambulance called by a neighbour arrives and takes Nakano to hospital. He dies, but re-awakens and escapes. Meanwhile, Sato records a public message threatening to change public opinion by force, commencing with an attack on a pharmaceuticals company in 10 days.
9	9	"Wait, Let's Talk it Over"; Transliteration: "Mate, Mōichido Hanashiaō" (Japanese: 待て、もう一度話し合おう)	March 12, 2016
Ko Nakano comes across Black Ghost tracks and finds Kei Nagai who is now acting as the grandson of the old lady in the village with her consent. Ko suggests that they join forces to fight Sato. Although Kei agrees with Ko, he really wants a peaceful life, and traps Ko in an abandoned truck to restrain him. Meanwhile Sato and the new Ajin prepare for the beginning of the war on humanity. Back at the Ajin Control Commission, Sokabe is assigned to monitor Tosaki, and possibly become his successor. Regardless, Tosaki continues to brutally question his captive Ogura for information about Ajin. After being allowed to smoke his preferred brand of cigarettes, Ogura is prepared to talk.
10	10	"They Start to Decay as Soon as They're Created"; Transliteration: "Hassei to Dōji ni Hōkai ga Hajimatte iru" (Japanese: 発生と同時に崩壊が始まっている)	March 19, 2016
Ogura starts telling what he knows about Ajin and Black Ghosts or IBMs (Invisible Black Matter). For example: IBMs have individual characteristics and are unstable; last only about 10 minutes; can be generated only 1-2 times per day; are difficult to control in the rain. Kei keeps Ko locked up and continues to try to understand how the Black Ghost behaves, for example he found that it does the opposite of what he tells it to do. Kei is seen in the woods by a local who becomes suspicious. To allay the fears of the local officials, Kei appeals personally to them to accept him into the village. Sokabe reports that Tosaki is acting under his own authority and suspects that he has Ogura, but the minister decides to take no action and continue to monitor him. Sato's group prepare for their attack on the Grant Pharmaceuticals company.
11	11	"It's Show Time"; Transliteration: "Sā, Shōtaimuda" (Japanese: さあ、ショウタイムだ)	March 26, 2016
Sato's group puts his plan into action with the assistance of the three new Ajin, sabotaging a building dressed as cleaners. Tosaki coordinates the defense of Grant pharmaceuticals whose CEO does not stop production or send staff home. Kei still keeps Ko captive and refuses to stop Sato, enjoying his life playing the grandson of the old lady. Sato implements his plan, collapsing a nearby 50-story building onto Grant Pharmaceuticals, then challenging the elite Metropolitan Police Assault Team to defeat him.
12	12	"Whew, I'm Beat"; Transliteration: "Iyaa, Tsukareta ne" (Japanese: いやあ、疲れたね)	April 2, 2016
The Metropolitan Police Assault Team use different tactics to continually kill Sato to prevent him from acting against them. Two of Sato's Ajin begin shooting the police, but are themselves targeted by police snipers. However, Tanaka uses his Black Ghost to attack the snipers in turn. A break in the action enables Sato to revive and use his Black Ghost to distract the Metropolitan Police Assault Team so he can wipe them out by firing at close range. After killing them all, Sato calmly walks away. Mr Keita, the villager who saw Kei in the woods, sees the ensuing news coverage and recognises a picture of Kei.
13	13	"Sato, It's All Your Fault!"; Transliteration: "Satō-san, Anta no Sei de Mechakuchada" (Japanese: 佐藤さん、あんたのせいでメチャクチャだ)	April 9, 2016
Mr Keita reports Kei Nagai to the police to claim a reward. Yu Tosaki orders all available forces to the area to catch Kei. When Kei is confronted by the police, he uses his Black Ghost to delay them allowing him to escape into the woods. He uses Ko Nakano's phone to throw the police off his trail, but Tosaki realizes it is a ruse and closes in. Kei releases Ko and they try to escape together, but they are intercepted by Tosaki who shoots them with tranquilizer darts. Kei manages to invoke his Black Ghost to attack Tosaki, but Izumi Shimomura invokes hers to intercept it. The Black Ghosts battle each other, and it gives time for Kei and Ko to revive and run. Shimomura's Black Ghost pursues them, but much to Tosaki and Shimomura's surprise, Kei manages to keep on recreating his. The boys manage to escape and Kei finally decides it is time for them to take out Sato, blaming him for the destruction of his peaceful life. Sato makes another public broadcast, announcing a 'Second Wave' action to assassinate 15 people involved in the conspiracy against Ajin, and if there is no improvement in the treatment of Ajin, a 'Third Wave' where he intends to rule the country.

=== Season 2 ===
No. overall	No. in season	Title	Original release date
14	1	"I'm Getting Sick of This"; Transliteration: "Nanka Mendokusaku Natte Kita" (Japanese: なんかめんどくさくなってきた)	October 8, 2016
Sokabe informs Yu Tosaki that he must resign his position because of his failure to stop Sato and for allowing Kei and Ko to escape. Sato announces his 'Second Wave' action to assassinate 15 people he believes are involved in the conspiracy against Ajin, subject to 2 conditions which include the government admitting to experiments on Ajin. Meanwhile Kei discusses options to trap Sato with Ko and he decides they need a powerful ally, Yu Tosaki. They drive in a stolen car to the hospital where Yu Tosaki's comatose girlfriend lies to force him to meet them. Yu Tosaki confronts Kei who proposes that they work together to stop Sato and Tosaki reluctantly agrees. When Sato realizes that the government will not meet his demands, he makes another public announcement to start his 'Second Wave' action and kills a young surgeon who is one of the 15 people on his list.
15	2	"I'm Surrounded by Idiots"; Transliteration: "Doitsu Mo Koitsu Mo Baka Bakkari Da" (Japanese: どいつもこいつもバカばっかりだ)	October 15, 2016
Sato changes his looks while his assistants buy airline tickets. Kei and Ko undergo physical training while Tosaki tries to devise a plan to catch and hold Sato. Izumi takes them to meet Ikuya Ogura who asks Kei to bring out his IBM and then carries out some tests. He confirms that the IBM does the opposite of what Kei tells it, that it can acts on its own impulses, but that not all IBMs behave in the same way, depending on the host person. Sato boards a plane carrying Kazuo Sakurai, one of his assassination targets, and smuggles a bag on board with the help of his assistant Okyuama's IBM. Once airborne, he kills the man and his guards, then detonates a bomb forcing the plane to land in the sea. Meanwhile during training, Kei cautions Ko against becoming too friendly with the Ministry's troops as they may have to be sacrificed to capture Sato, surprising Ko with his apparent callousness. Later, Kei experiments alone with his IBM, but finds that it is more difficult to control than he thought.
16	3	"But, I'm Always Scared"; Transliteration: "Ore Wa Itsu Datte Kowai" (Japanese: 俺はいつだって怖い)	October 22, 2016
Kei tells Ogura of his frustration at not being able to control his IBM. Ogura tells him, that to change the IBM's behavior, Kei must change his own. Tosaki predicts that Sato's next target will be Kishi, the Minister for Health, Labour and Welfare, and begins plans to trap Sato. However, before Tosaki can prepare his trap, Sato's team find Kishi's location in the mountains and kill him using an IBM despite the high security. Tosaki's team continue training and preparations, learning more about IBMs using Ogura's knowledge. Kei contemplates the need to change his behavior, and his lack of empathy for others. Tosaki reminds Kei that his best friend Kaito is in juvenile detention for helping him. Meanwhile Kaito meets his new cellmate with some apprehension.
17	4	"They Make Me Sick"; Transliteration: "Hedo Ga Demasu Ne" (Japanese: 反吐が出ますね)	October 29, 2016
Kaito's new moody teenage cellmate, Kotobuki Takeshi has escaped once in baffling circumstances, and 3 adult prisoners want to know how he did it. He says he does not know, but they try to beat the information out of him. Kaito intervenes to help, and is badly beaten, receiving no assistance from Takeshi. Takeshi tells Kaito that he defends Takeshi against other prisoners at his own risk. TV news announces that Iwasaki Keita who was on Sato's list was killed with his bodyguards. Later, two more men on the list are also killed. Meanwhile Tosaki's team including Kei and Ko continue their physical and mental training. Douglas Almeida and Carley Myers arrive from the U.S. Department of Defense meet their Japanese counterparts to investigate the death of Professor Ogura who they believe was killed by Sato, but who is in fact still alive as part of Tosaki's plan. At the prison, the three adult inmates start beating Takeshi, and Kaito intervenes again to help. As Kaito is about to be choked to death, Takeshi activates his IBM to protect Kaito who now realizes that Takeshi is an Ajin. Takeshi offers to get Kaito out of prison if he wants to leave.
18	5	"Kuro, Please…"; Transliteration: "Kuro-chan, Onegai" (Japanese: クロちゃん、お願い)	November 5, 2016
Tosaki's plan is in final preparation as two more people on Sato's list are killed. Tosaki is questioned by Myers and Almeida who is suspicious about Ogura's death and believes that Tosaki is withholding information. Four more people on Sato's list are killed. Meanwhile Tosaki's team including Kei and Ko increase their preparation to confront Sato. Tosaki gets Shimomura to steal the Minister's schedule to lay a trap for Sato. While Tosaki is waiting for her in the carpark, Almeida immobilizes and abducts him. Shimomura arrives and attacks with her IBM, but Myers is also an Ajin and she uses her own IBM to disable Shimomura, leaving her to die. They leave with the unconscious Tosaki in their car.
19	6	"Must be Tough Being a Lapdog"; Transliteration: "Kaiinu Wa Taihenda Na" (Japanese: 飼い犬は大変だな)	November 12, 2016
As Shimomura lays bleeding to death in the car park, she thinks back to when her name was Yoko Tainaka and her stepfather sold her out as an Ajin. Sometime later, Tosaki revealed that her mother and stepfather died in a fight when her mother attacked her stepfather after Yoko fled the house. Meanwhile Almeida mercilessly tortures Tosaki to discover the whereabouts of Ogura but he will not talk. When she recovers, Shimomura tells Kei and the others what happened. Kei decides to move their hideout rather than rescue Tosaki to Shimomura's horror. She forcefully convinces Kei that she and Tosaki are necessary to defeat Sato, so they prepare a rescue plan. Kei's team raid the safe hideout where Tosaki is being held, but Almeida and Myers escape with him, while Almeida cruelly berates Myers for what he sees as her faults. Kei and the team give chase by car, but Almeida heads for the USA Embassy.
20	7	"Kuro, Just Once More, Please!"; Transliteration: "Kuro-chan, Mōichido Dake" (Japanese: クロちゃん、もう一度だけ)	November 19, 2016
Sato's group prepare to assassinate the Minister. While chasing Almeida, Kei sends his IBM ahead to intercept them which causes them to crash into the car driven by Shimomura and the chase continues on foot. Myers disables Shimomura, but while Almeida berates Myers again for her failings, Shimomura shoots him instead of Myers with a tranquilizer dart to shut him up. Angry at her treatment, Myers then takes his gun and kills him, leaving to start a new life. When Tosaki awakes, he's angry that his team rescued him instead of following their plan to trap Sato. Meanwhile, Sato has ambushed the Minister. The Minister tries to make a deal, but Sato kills him anyway. Kei sends an email to the Americans saying that Sato has Ogura to send them after Sato. Meanwhile, Sato announces that he will kill the remaining target, President Hashiguchi of Musashi Heavy Industries, at a Directors meeting in 3 days. Chief Cabinet Secretary Mitsui announces a new powerful Anti-Ajin Special Force. Tosaki says that this has obviously been in preparation for some time and that they have a new inhumane weapon. Nevertheless, Tosaki and Kei agree to continue their objective of stopping Sato themselves.
21	8	"This Country is Going to Get a Little Unsettled"; Transliteration: "Kono Kuni Chotto Taihen na Koto ni Naru Kara" (Japanese: この国ちょっと大変なことになるから)	November 26, 2016
With a new target announced by Sato, Tosaki's team are presented with another opportunity to capture him; however, Tosaki unfairly starts to take out his frustrations for their previous failure on Shimomura. Chief Cabinet Secretary Mitsui demonstrates a new range of anti-Ajin weapons which he says will stop Sato. Although there are some misgivings in Sato's group about his strategy, the Ajin realize their best chance is to stay with him. Sato tells Nekozawa who provided special technology to leave as things are getting kind of tough in this country, which he plans to rule. Kei outlines their new plan which assumes Sato will be successful and so they decide to attack after he defeats the anti-Ajin forces. Tosaki blackmails Sokabe into helping him get access to the Musashi Heavy Industries building and to be reinstated. On the day of the Musashi Heavy Industries meeting, Sato commences his attack, outwitting the government forces by taking out all electronic devices with an EMP. With the area in darkness and no communications Kei decides to go on the offensive rather than wait until Sato carries out his plan.
22	9	"You're the One Messing Up My Life!"; Transliteration: "Jama shiteru no wa anta no hō daro" (Japanese: 邪魔してるのはあんたの方だろ)	December 3, 2016
Sato's group enter the Musashi Heavy Industries building, but with most of their special weapons neutralized by Sato, the anti-Ajin force are limited to fighting him with conventional weapons. The anti-Ajins are well trained to incapacitate Sato's group without killing them; however, Sato's combat skills prove too good for them. Sato's group reach the upper floors, but they encounter Kei's group who are already in position. When Sato reaches the meeting room, Kei already has President Hashiguchi prisoner, threatening to kill him and deprive Sato of his victory. Sato appears to be defeated and is shot with tranquilizer darts. Although unconscious, his IBM is still active and it takes out Kei's group and 'resets' Sato by killing him. Sato then kills all the human members of Kei's group when they try to stop him and Kei is unable to activate his IBM. Suddenly more anti-Ajin forces attack by helicopter and force Sato's group to retreat with the company president whom Sato kills to gain access to a store chemical weapons. Kei, Shimomura and Ko are arrested by Sokabe who plans to have them tried as accomplices, but Tosaki tranquilizes Sokabe and frees them. Tosaki drives them off, frustrated at their failure to stop Sato and with Kei devastated at the death of Manabe and the other humans.
23	10	"I Won't Do It"; Transliteration: "Boku wa yarimasen yo" (Japanese: 僕はやりませんよ)	December 10, 2016
After their failure to stop Sato and now a wanted fugitive, Tosaki angrily berates Kei, who quietly accepts the blame. While the Japanese and U.S. governments separately prepare for Sato's third wave, some of Sato's Ajins begin to doubt whether their leader really cares for Ajin rights. Sato's group assaults and easily captures a Self-Defense Force base and sets up missile launchers armed with nerve gas stolen from Muhashi Heavy Industries. In his broadcast from the base, Sato announces the beginning of his third wave and demands that the Japanese government turn over all state of affairs to the Ajin in one week's time. Failure to meet this deadline will mean that he will launch the chemical missiles and exterminate all humans in Japan. Watching the broadcast, Tosaki realizes that it is now everyone's problem and encourages the group to stop Sato once more. Kei, however, refuses to do so.
24	11	"At This Rate... It Really Will be War!"; Transliteration: "Kore ja honto ni sensou ja nai suka" (Japanese: これじゃホントに戦争じゃないすか)	December 17, 2016
The U.S. government offers to assist in the fight against Sato, but the Japanese are reluctant to agree. The Japanese government offer some Japanese islands to Sato for the Ajin, but Sato angrily launches a nerve gas projectile to further assert his demands for full control of Japan. He gives the Japanese government 3 days to surrender before he launches all his missiles. Meanwhile, Sato's demands and game-playing cause dissension in his group as it will escalate their war, so most plan to desert him. The launch motivates some civilians to hunt down families of Ajin, including Kei's sister Eriko at the hospital. Kei intervenes to save her, but his IBM will not appear. Fortunately Kaito appears, accompanied by his fellow cellmate Kotobuki with his IBM to save them. After subtly telling Kaito to look after Eriko, Kei decides to return to Tosaki's group in order to stop Sato. The Japanese forces try a sneak attack on Sato but fall into a trap and are killed.
25	12	"But That Makes it Interesting, So Whatever"; Transliteration: "Demo mā, omoshiro-sōdakara īkedo ne" (Japanese: でもまあ、面白そうだからいいけどね)	December 17, 2016
The U.S. military plan to release the nerve gas under the Self-Defense Force base to kill Sato, but which will also kill tens of thousands of citizens within the area. The Japanese government agrees, but have 7 hours to act before the plan is implemented. Tosaki and Kei meet Sato's men, Masumi Okuyama, Takahashi and Gen who offer to help capture Sato. They reluctantly agree to work together and Kei suggests a plan to bury Sato alive. Sato and Tanaka leave the Self-Defense Force base for their hideout and prepare for a showdown with the U.S. and Japanese forces. Kei's group of Ajin takes them by surprise, but this time, using Sato's psychological weaknesses they him lure him into a trap in the tunnels. Just as Sato is buried by a collapsed ceiling, the floor of the tunnel gives way and Kei's group fall into the hole. Izumi resets, and finds Tosaki trapped by rubble. As she looks for the others, Sato emerges from the darkness, still alive.
26	13	"I'll Make You a Promise Too, Mr. Sato"; Transliteration: "Boku mo Yakusoku Shimasu yo, Satō-san" (Japanese: 僕も約束しますよ、佐藤さん)	December 24, 2016
Kei's Ajin group revive in the tunnels, but are separated by rubble. Sato goes after Izumi and the injured Tosaki who frees her from her contract. Free to do as she likes, Izumi decides to confront Sato. She is no match, and when Sato is about to cut off her head, Kei arrives and stops him with his IBM. As their IBMs battle each other Sato punishes Kei severely, while Izumi manages to shoot Tanaka with a tranquilizer dart. Only minutes remain before the U.S. plan to release the nerve gas. Sato corners Kei and prepares to decapitate him, when suddenly multiples of Kei's IBM materialize and attack Sato and remove his head. As Sato's body regenerates, the U.S. forces attack and shoot him with tranquilizer darts. They are about to arrest Kei and his group when Tosaki and Sokabe arrive and claim that they are under the protection of the Japanese government, so the U.S. forces leave with only Sato and Tanaka. Sokabe says Kei and his group are pardoned and free to go. The Japanese government announces that Ajin will now have full citizen rights. Later, after Kei resumes his normal quiet life, he receives a phone call from Tosaki saying that the plane carrying Sato exploded in mid air.

=== OAD ===
Three OAD (original animation DVD) episodes have been released. The first was released on May 6, 2016, the second on October 7, 2016, and the third on April 7, 2017.

No.	Title	Original release date
1	"Nakamura Shinya Incident"; Transliteration: "Nakamura Shinya Jiken" (Japanese: 中村慎也事件)	May 6, 2016
While running late to attend a party, Shinya Nakamura dies in a motorcycle accident, but revives and learned he is an Ajin. After hiding the evidence of his death, Shinya was almost run over again until Yusuke saves him. As Shinya was about to tell Yusuke he was an Ajin, the Ajin Management Committee's gunmen show up to capture him and shoot Yusuke. They kill Shinya but his black ghosts appear and kill the gunmen. After reviving, Shinya listens to Yusuke's final words and leaves town. Meanwhile, Tosaki decides to find an Ajin to help him quietly investigate the Shinya Nakamura incident and checks an unconfirmed report of one living in Hyogo.
2	"Hidden Inn / Secret Den"; Transliteration: "Kakureya no Ryokan / Himitsu no Ajito" (Japanese: 隠れ家の旅館 / 秘密のアジト)	October 7, 2016
Four humorous short stories from the points of view of Sato and Tanaka (2 stories), Izumi and Tosaki (1 story), and Ko and Kei (1 story).
3	"Satō:ZERO"; Transliteration: "Satō:Zero" (Japanese: 佐藤:ゼロ)	April 7, 2017
Taking place immediately after the prologue scene from Episode 1, a squad of U.S. marines amuse themselves of their objective's apparent immortality. One in particular, codenamed Fox, seems particularly interested in the possibilities of having such an ability, such as being able to stage terrorist attacks without having to die as if it were a game. During the debriefing, the squad's CO reminds them of the secrecy of their mission, though it is already spreading that such people would be called demi-humans. Prior to their next mission to capture an African warlord alive, Fox considers killing himself to find out whether he is immortal but backs out at the last moment. That night, the squad silently infiltrates the enemy compound and captures the warlord unharmed. However, Fox declares himself to be bored, and fires two shots which alerts the enemy to "start the game". Fox eliminates the enemy, and is about to kill their captive until he is knocked out by a fellow marine. Fox's actions leads to his dishonourable discharge from the military. Sometime later, Fox (now going by Sato) discovers he is indeed immortal after killing unknown assailants. In a post credits scene, Sato watches a leaked video of scientists "experimenting" on Tanaka, and prepares to rescue him.
