= Unreal =

Unreal may refer to:

== Books and TV ==
- Unreal (short story collection), a 1985 book of short stories by Paul Jennings
- Unreal (TV series), a 2015 television drama series on Lifetime
- WWE Unreal, a 2025 documentary series on Netflix

== Computing and games ==
- Unreal (video game series), various computer games set in the Unreal universe
  - Unreal (1998 video game), first-person shooter computer game from the series
- Unreal (1990 video game), a 1990 game published by Ubisoft
- Unreal Engine, a widely used game engine upon which the Unreal games among others are built
- Unreal (demo), a 1992 computer programming demo by Future Crew
- UnrealIRCd, an Internet Relay Chat daemon

== Music ==
=== Albums ===
- Unreal (End of You album), 2006
- Unreal (Flumpool album), 2008
- UnReal (My Ticket Home album), 2017
- Unreal!!!, by Ray Stevens, 1970
- Unreal, by Bloodstone, 1973
- Unreal, by Mr.Kitty, 2024

=== Songs ===
- "Unreal" (song), by Ill Niño, 2002
- "Unreal", by Dreamworld, 1995
- "Unreal", by Gord Bamford from Country Junkie, 2013
- "Unreal", by Soil from Scars, 2001
- "Unreal", by Unkle from Psyence Fiction, 1998

== See also ==
- Unreality (disambiguation)
