= What's Flumpool!? =

What's flumpool!?

Studio album by Flumpool
- Released: December 23, 2009
- Recorded: 2008–2009
- Genre: J-pop
- Length: 1:19:58
- Label: A-Sketch

Flumpool chronology
Unreal (2008)	What's flumpool!? (2009)	Fantasia of Life Stripe (2011)

Professional ratings
Review scores
Source	Rating
AllMusic	3.5/5 stars

What's flumpool!? is the first full album by Japanese rock band Flumpool, released on December 23, 2009. Its cover is similar to Unreal's in that it features the band members nude, though this time as statuettes. It is one of the longest recordings on a CD in history, with 79 minutes and 58 seconds, 2 seconds under the maximum a CD can contain.

== Track listing ==
What's flumpool!?
No.	Title	Length
1.	"Calling"	5:04
2.	"Hoshi ni Negai wo" (星に願いを, Wish Upon a Star)	4:18
3.	"Mitsumete Itai" (見つめていたい, Every Breath You Take)	5:13
4.	"MW ~Dear Mr. & Mrs. Picaresque" (MW ~Dear Mr. & Mrs. ピカレスク~)	4:37
5.	"Boku wa Guuzen wo Matte Iru Rashii" (僕は偶然を待っているらしい, It Seems I'm Waiting for a Miracle)	4:12
6.	"Kaiten Mokuba (Merry-Go-Round)" (回転木馬, Merry-Go-Round)	5:26
7.	"Shasou" (車窓, Car Window)	5:09
8.	"Hills"	4:50
9.	"Natsu Dive" (夏Dive, Summer Dive)	4:14
10.	"LOVE 2010"	5:14
11.	"Quville"	4:27
12.	"Saigo no Page" (最後のページ, The Last Page)	5:37
13.	"Kotoshi no Sakura" (今年の桜, This Year's Cherry Blossoms)	4:52
14.	"Time Capsule" (タイムカプセル)	4:40
15.	"Siren" (サイレン)	3:53
16.	"Frame" (フレイム (Album Version))	4:52
Total length:		1:19:58

== Charts ==
Release	Oricon Albums Chart	Peak position	Debut sales (copies)	Sales total (copies)	Chart run
November 19, 2009	Daily Charts	2	22,572	159,324	7 weeks
November 19, 2009	Weekly Charts	2	90,102	159,324	7 weeks
November 19, 2009	Monthly Charts (January 2010)	9	90,102	159,324	7 weeks
November 19, 2009	Yearly Charts (2010)	47	-	159,324	7 weeks
