= PICO-8 =

Virtual machine and game engine

- Screenshot
- Developer: Lexaloffle Games
- Release: April 2015; 11 years ago
- Stable release: 0.2.7 / 16 August 2025; 15 months ago
- Operating system: Windows, Mac OS, Linux
- Platform: PC, Raspberry Pi, HTML5 (player only)
- Included with: PocketCHIP
- Available in: English, Japanese
- Type: Virtual machine, game engine, fantasy video game console
- License: Proprietary
- Website: lexaloffle.com/pico-8.php

PICO-8 is a virtual machine and game engine created by Lexaloffle Games. It is a fantasy video game console that mimics the limited audio-visual capabilities of 8-bit systems from the 1980s to encourage creativity and ingenuity in producing games without being overwhelmed with the many possibilities of modern tools and machines. Such limitations also give PICO-8 games a particular look and feel.

Coding on the PICO-8 is accomplished through a Lua-based environment, in which users can create music, sound effects, sprites, maps, and games.

Users are able to export their games as HTML5 web games or upload their creations to Lexaloffle's official BBS where other users are able to play the games in a web browser, and view the source code. PICO-8 games can also be exported as executable programs, which will run on Windows, macOS, or Linux.

Its successor is Picotron, another virtual machine dubbed as a fantasy workstation with fewer constraints.

Notable games released for the system include the original version of Celeste, which was created in four days as a part of a game jam.

== Capabilities ==
The PICO-8 program integrates a Lua code editor, sprite and map creation tools, and an audio sound effect and music editor. The program can load games saved locally on a computer, in the form of text or as specially encoded PNG images. The interface also supports a splore mode, where games uploaded to the BBS can be previewed and then played in the PICO-8 program.

PICO-8 games, as well as the program's interface itself, are limited to a 128 × 128 pixel, 16-color display, and a 4-channel audio output.

As of v0.1.11, users may export Pico-8 cartridges as stand-alone executables for Windows, Linux (64 bit), Mac, and Raspberry Pi.

=== Color palette ===
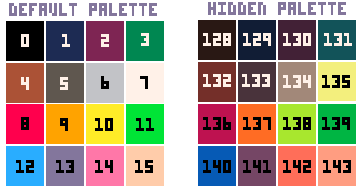
16-color default palette of PICO-8 along with 16 hidden colors

The PICO-8 palette contains 16 colors. Colors in the palette can be replaced with a different set of colors by indexing a palette update with a color ID larger than 127. These colors are not officially recognized by the creators; however, they are embraced by the community and given unofficial names.

== Development ==
Joseph White, who is better known by his nickname Zep, started to work on a BBC BASIC styled BASIC interpreter dubbed LEX500. Joseph later returned to LEX500 while working on another game engine called Voxatron. During development, Joseph switched from BASIC to Lua 2 syntax as the latter is easier to use and more capable as a programming language. He added built-in tools to it such as a music tracker and a map editor, and decided to rename it PICO-8.

Joseph got inspiration from older systems while setting the limitations of PICO-8. The 16-color palette was inspired by the Commodore 64, 4-channel trackers by the Amiga 500, and overall aesthetics by other 80s hardware such as the Apple II and the Nintendo Entertainment System. He coined the term fantasy console to describe systems like PICO-8 that have deliberate limitations to fit a hypothetical hardware.

PICO-BASIC v0.0. was initially revealed at Pico Pico Cafe on May 9, 2014 by Lexaloffle Games. PICO-8 was released in 2015. However, the copyright year uses "2014", as in "2014-15" or "2014-2015".

In 2024, after 10 years of the development of the virtual machine and game engine, the Alpha release of Picotron was launched on March 14, 2024. This followed the launch of the PICO-8 software version 0.2.6 on February 28, 2024.

== Hardware ==
As a fantasy console, PICO-8 does not have an official hardware that it is based on and all of its limitations are purely emulated. Homebrew computer and hardware hobbyists in general have made attempts to fit PICO-8 in low-end devices. PICO-8 has an official image for Raspberry Pi and CHIP (shipped pre-installed in Pocket CHIP), and the PICO-8 community managed to directly run the official software or the games via PICO-8 emulators available in RetroArch on other single board computers.

While it is not possible to run PICO-8 itself on devices that are not at least i386/amd64 or ARM-64 due to several libraries, people have managed to emulate PICO-8 games on various low-cost handheld consoles via open source emulators such as Fake-08 and tac08. The emulators function even on devices based on 32-bit microcontrollers (most notably ESP32). In 2025, Infinity, a PICO-8 emulator, was released on the Google Play Store, followed in February 2026 by PicPic on the App Store.

== Adoption ==
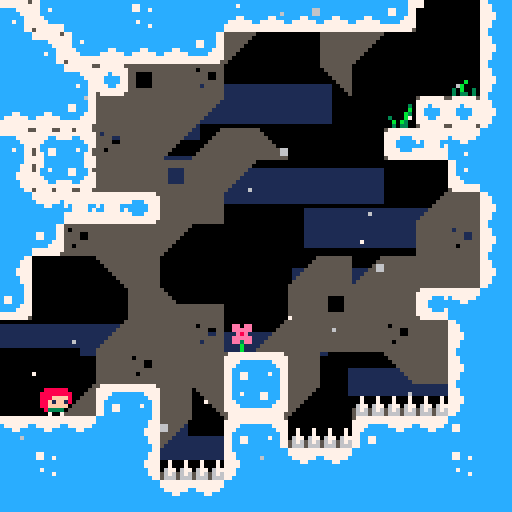
Celeste Classic, developed for PICO-8

The release of PICO-8 attracted the attention of programmers and video game developers who enjoyed the challenge of developing under retro-style limitations, and spurred the development of similar game engines with intentionally similar limitations. These engines are now commonly dubbed "fantasy consoles", based on the definition of the term on PICO-8's website, and roughly simulate the strict limitations of old game consoles and computers. Among these are the TIC-80, which styles itself as a "fantasy computer", and the Pixel Vision 8, which allows the user to specify the simulated hardware limitations they wish to develop under. The development of fantasy consoles, as well as the development of games for them, has evolved into its own, almost exclusively hobbyist, sub-community of game development and programming.

PICO-8 gained additional attention in 2018 with the release of Celeste. Originally created as a PICO-8 game for a game jam, Celeste Classic became one of the most popular games on the PICO-8 BBS, prompting the developers to expand the concept into a more expansive, fully realized game. The original PICO-8 version of Celeste is fully playable as an easter egg in the full version of the game.

Design process of a 3D truck with textures on picoCAD

A low poly CAD software named picoCAD is based on PICO-8 and can be used to make models for use both inside and outside of PICO-8. It is able to export models as OBJ/MTL and also can export rotating model animations as GIF. Since its release, picoCAD has been used in many 3D PICO-8 games for the creation of models. The software got popularized in the general pixel art and retro game development community due to its unique retro aesthetic. In March of 2026, picoCAD 2 was released as a sequel to picoCAD, featuring new tools, notably for animation.

Several remakes and demakes of well-known retro and modern games alike are made on PICO-8. Most notable ones include Terra (Terraria), Poom (Doom), Fuz (Fez), Low Mem Sky (No Man's Sky), and unDUNE II (Dune II).

PICO-8 has also seen interest among the demoscene, due to its harsh restrictions attracting programmers and musicians who wish to make retro-style demos for the console.

In March 2024, several PICO-8 games were added as cabinets to Arcade Legend, a VR game where players can play retro arcade games.

== See also ==
- CHIP-8 – a predecessor to PICO-8 and other fantasy consoles
