= CHIP (computer) =

Single-board computer

- Released: May 31, 2016
- Introductory price: US$9
- Operating system: Linux (Debian)
- CPU: 1 GHz R8M/R8 (ARMv7)
- Memory: 512 MB DDR3 SDRAM
- Storage: 4 GB - 8 GB onboard
- Power: 5 V DC >500 mA, wired or optional battery

CHIP (stylized as C.H.I.P.) was a single-board computer crowdfunded and produced by the now-defunct Next Thing Co. (NTC). Advertised as "the world's first $9 computer," it was released in 2015 as open-source hardware running a customized, Debian-based Linux operating system.

The CHIP was designed for hobbyists and embedded hardware projects, including a 1 GHz ARMv7 processor, 512MB of RAM, onboard storage, and integrated Wi-Fi and Bluetooth. The product line later expanded to include the CHIP Pro and peripherals like the Pocket CHIP.

== History ==
=== Founding and crowdfunding ===
Next Thing Co. (NTC) was originally established as a hardware start-up in Oakland, California, in 2013 by founders Dave Rauchwek, Gustavo Huber, and Thomas Deckert. In May 2015, the company launched a Kickstarter campaign to fund the production of the CHIP, marketing it as "the world's first $9 computer." The campaign was highly successful, quickly surpassing its initial goal of $50,000, ultimately raising $2,071,972 from 39,560 backers.

=== Production and release ===
Following the funding campaign, NTC began shipping alpha versions of the CHIP board to its "Kernel Hacker" tier backers on September 25, 2015. General pre-orders for the public opened shortly after, in December 2015. By May 31, 2016, the company had begun its first wave of consumer shipping to fulfill the remaining Kickstarter backer rewards.

=== Discontinuation and insolvency ===
Despite early momentum, and the subsequent development of models like the CHIP Pro, the company struggled to maintain production of the original board. Next Thing Co. halted pre-orders for the original chip by April 4, 2017, effectively discontinuing the line.

By March 2018, Next Thing Co. had entered insolvency. The company's assets and intellectual properties were subsequently sold off, and operations ceased. At the time of the company's closure, a significant number of customers who had placed post-Kickstarted pre-orders had not received their devices or refunds.

== Models ==
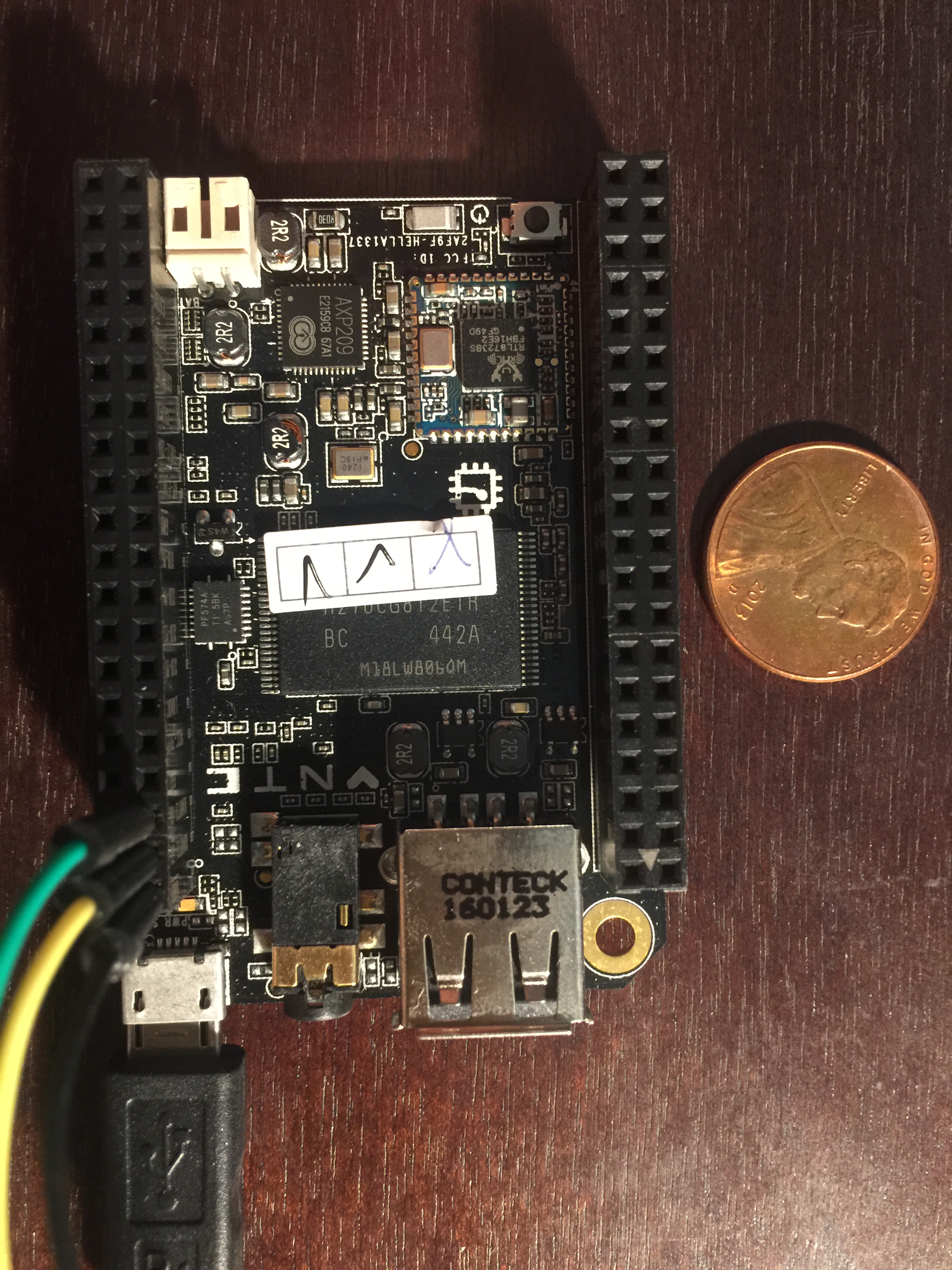
CHIP board, front side

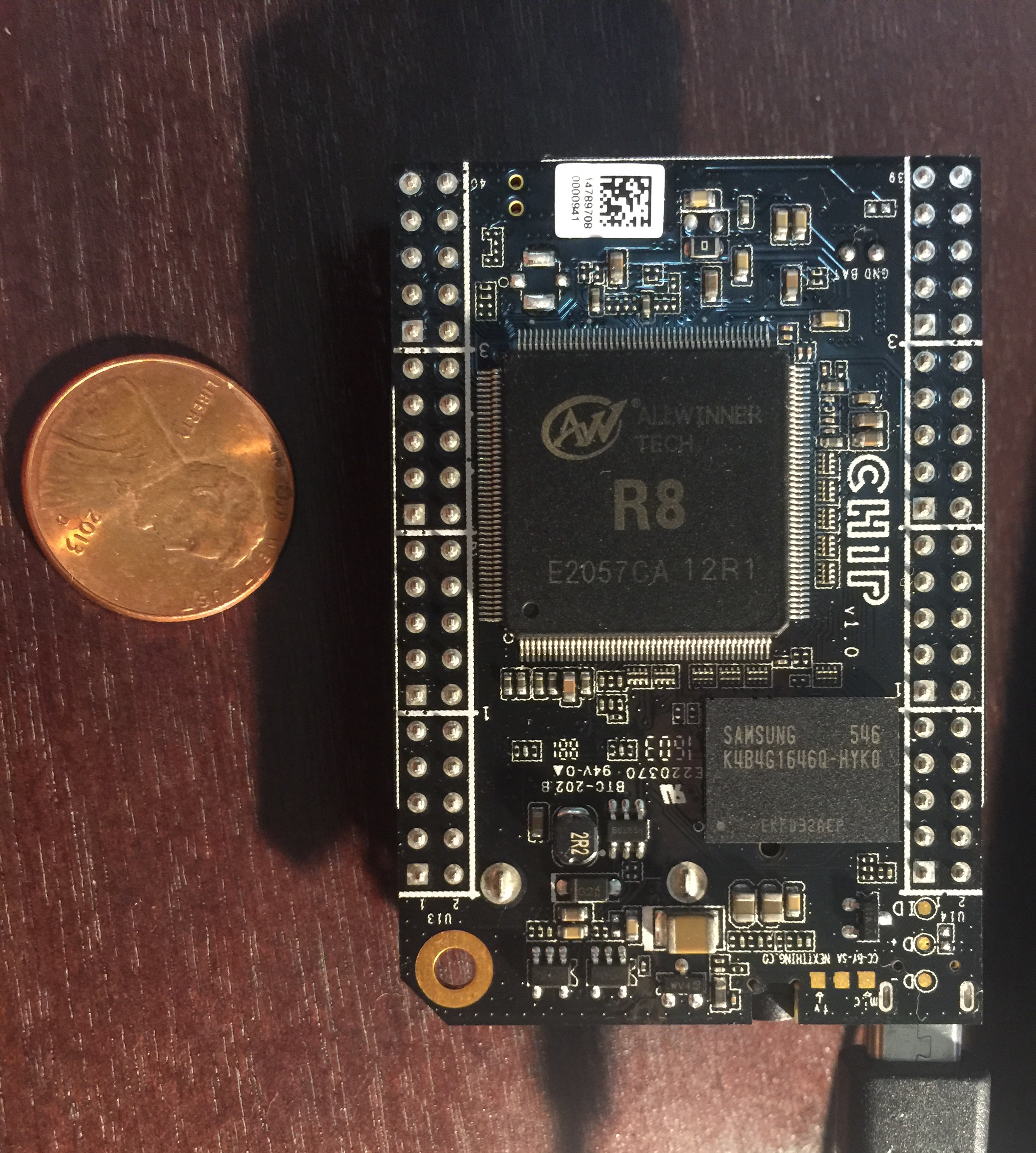
CHIP board, rear side

=== CHIP ===
CHIP was the original board, mostly targeting hobbyists. The system is built around the Allwinner R8 SoC processor, which integrates an ARM Cortex-A8 CPU (based on ARM architecture V7-A) and peripherals, such as Graphic Engine, UART, SPI, USB ports, CIR, CMOS Sensor Interface and LCD controller. The CPU is also accompanied by a NEON SIMD coprocessor and has RCT JAVA-Accelerations to optimize just-in-time (JIT) and dynamic adaptive compilation (DAC). There is also an ARM Mali-400 GPU, and a H263, H264 and vp8 hardware video decoder in the R8.

CHIP was upgraded in April 2017 in anticipation of the CHIP Pro to "share a large number of the same components".

Features implemented on this model:

- Built-in Wi-Fi 802.11b/g/n, Bluetooth 4.0
- One USB host with a type-A receptacle, one USB On-The-Go port
- Composite video and stereo audio port via mini TRRS
- Optional composite TRRS to RCA audio-video cable
- Optional VGA adapter and HDMI adapter (see Hardware extensions below)
- Open source hardware and open source software
- Up to 45 GPIO ports
- Supports 1-Wire and I2C protocols, PWM output
- Serial console and Ethernet via USB for quick headless operation
- Power options include 5V via USB OTG, 5V via CHN pin, and by 3.7V battery
- Onboard NAND storage, 4-8GB, pre-installed Linux OS (Debian)
- Web-based firmware update

The CHIP is 60mm × 40mm in size.

=== CHIP Pro ===
CHIP Pro is similar to the original CHIP board, but uses the newer GR8 version of the chip. It is a system in package (SiP) made by Next Thing Co. It features a 1 GHz Allwinner R8 ARMv7 Cortex-A8 processor with NEON SIMD extensions and a Mali-400 GPU. 256MB of Nanya Technology DDR3 SDRAM is combined with the R8 SoC into a 14mm × 14mm, 0.8mm-pitch 252-ball FBGA package, simplifying the routing of connections. Instead of having two dual-line 40-pin sockets as on CHIP, it implements castellated edges where the pin holes are designed and optimized to embed to another board with SMT. Most of the CHIP's hardware features are also included in this model.

=== CHIP "v2" (unreleased) ===
Few details were available in regard to CHIP's would-be successor or successors except it would have used Next Thing's own SiP GR8 instead of Allwinner's original R8. In addition to feature-sharing with CHIP Pro, the company wanted to "take advantage of CHIP Pro's much more stable supply chain" in order to address the uneasiness in its user base about the future of the product. In responding to user concerns, Next Thing also disclosed that more than one successor product line was in the works.

As Next Thing Co. entered insolvency with its assets and intellectual properties being sold, release of "v2" is improbable.

== Hardware extensions ==
In addition to open-source hardware and software, Next Thing also published an HPI and an API for users to develop add-ons boards called "DIP" The company produced several DIPs including the Pocket CHIP.

=== Pocket CHIP and Pockulus ===
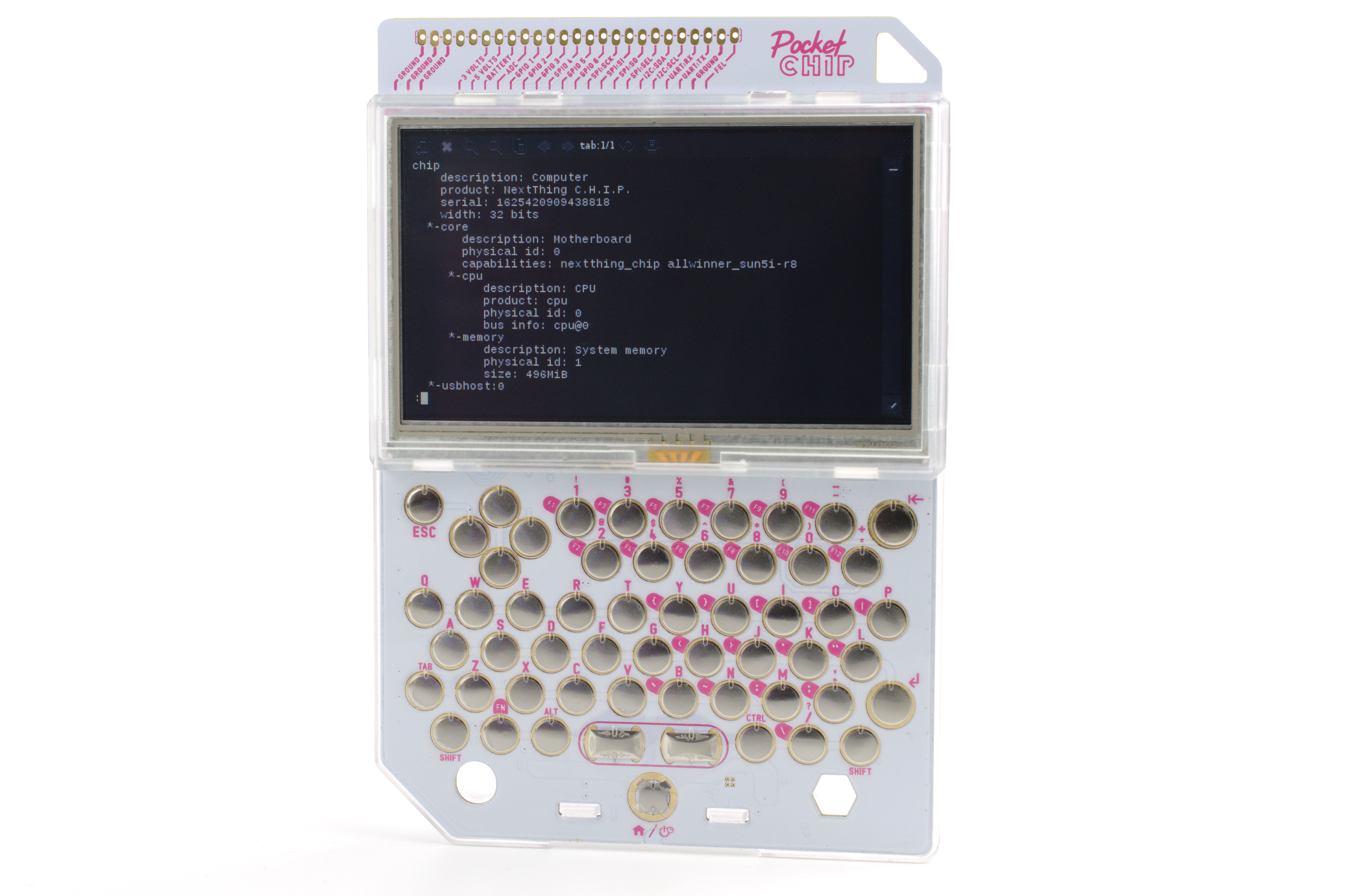
A PocketCHIP.

Pocket CHIP included a CHIP, a case with a 4.3 inch 480×272 pixel resistive touchscreen, a clicky keyboard, GPIO headers on the top of the device, GPIO soldering pads inside of the injection molded case, and a 5-hour battery. Following DIP specifications, the CHIP snapped into the case with no "screws or glues" creating a portable computer. On the lower right corner of the Pocket CHIP was a hexagonal hole that takes a standard #2 HB pencil. Inserting the pencil created a stand that allowed the Pocket CHIP to stand upright on a desk. Likewise, on the lower left is a circular hole for a pen.

PocketCHIP came loaded with a special edition of CHIP OS that included the DIP's driver and a couple of additional applications, including a special version of video game console virtual machine PICO-8, a fully functional Linux terminal, a file browser, a terminal based web browser called surf, and modular synthesizer SunVox.

The Pockulus is a virtual reality setup incorporating a Pocket CHIP that requires some 3D printing.

=== Other DIPs from Next Thing ===
For users who did not want to use the small screen in Pocket CHIP and also did not want to use the built-in composite TV output, Next Thing sold a VGA DIP and an HDMI DIP. Unlike Pocket CHIP, physical dimensions of these DIPs are similar to CHIP, so the snapped assembly looks like a thicker CHIP.

== Media coverage and user community ==
CHIP received favorable reviews, and constant comparisons to Raspberry Pi. Laura Sydell of NPR asked if the device could "spark a new wave of tinkering and innovation", noting it was also open source hardware. Marco della Cava of USA Today said that the device "represent[s] opportunities to both close the technology gap in developing and developed countries alike, while encouraging children to learn coding, due to their approachable design".

Reviewers also noted its low price. Bo Moore of PC Gamer said the price of CHIP "[puts] Raspberry Pi 2 to shame", and Ian Paul of PCWorld said it made "Raspberry Pi's price seem luxurious". Within days of the launch of its Kickstarter, US national media outlets like The Washington Post and Time followed with glowing coverage. Even Fortune joined the chorus with headline "This $9 computer could change the economics of building hardware."

Since its alpha shipping, CHIP has attracted an enthusiastic user base, communicating mainly on NTC's bulletin board system (BBS). At the time of NTC's demise, the BBS had over 10,000 users, with hundreds of active users and hundreds of postings every month, to a total of over 100,000.

Despite enthusiasm from reviewers and users, Next Thing Co. declared bankruptcy in March 2018, leaving many pre-order customers with undelivered orders.

=== Archives and continuing support ===
While NTC has published many of its hardware and software repositories on GitHub, surviving users also launched an effort in order to preserve useful documents, software, and other artifacts by leveraging the Internet Archive (a.k.a. archive.org). One effort is led by a user who has never received his preordered CHIP. Another user set up a standalone site focusing on binary packages and a Git repository.

In addition, the community also has a Wiki site that is independent of NTC. However, as of 2021, the website ceased to function. The original content is however available in the Internet Archive snapshot from November 2020.
