= Project Unreality =

Nintendo 64 emulator

- Project Unreality version 0.4a -1
- Developer: BlackBag
- Initial release: February 27, 1998; 27 years ago
- Final release: 0.4a -1 / May 25, 1998; 27 years ago
- Written in: C, C++
- Operating system: Windows
- Available in: English
- Type: Video game console emulator
- License: Freeware

Project Unreality was a video game console emulator for the Nintendo 64. It was notable for being one of the earliest attempts at Nintendo 64 emulation (predating UltraHLE by nearly a year), and the first Nintendo 64 emulator to successfully boot a commercial game.

== History ==
Development on Project Unreality started in late 1997, just over a year after the launch of the Nintendo 64. In its earliest days, Project Unreality had few contemporaries; at the time, emulators for current-generation consoles were often hoaxes or "shells" with extremely limited emulation capabilities.

By early 1998, Project Unreality could emulate homebrew games to some extent. The emulator's initial release saw its ability to boot commercial games, a first for any Nintendo 64 emulator.

== Discontinuation ==
In May 1998, lead programmer Michael Tedder announced that Project Unreality would be "put on the back burner for now", though no future updates were ever released. Slashdot later reported that one of Project Unreality's developers was hired to a game studio, leaving the emulator's development in limbo. This news coincided with Tedder's hiring to Z-Axis, where he continued to work until early 2000.

Though Tedder repeatedly claimed that Nintendo hadn't contacted him regarding Project Unreality, the rumor that Nintendo halted the emulator's development spread throughout the emulation scene; it has been suggested that UltraHLE's development was carried out in secret directly as a result of this rumor.
