= TIC-80 =

Free and open source fantasy video game console

- Logo used on the TIC-80 fantasy console/computer

- Screenshot
- Developer: Vadim Grigoruk (Nesbox)
- Release: 22 March 2017; 9 years ago
- Stable release: 1.1.2837 / 22 October 2023; 2 years ago
- Written in: C
- Operating system: Android, bare metal, Linux, Mac OS, Windows
- Platform: PC, Raspberry Pi, Nintendo 3DS, HTML5 (WebAssembly), RetroArch
- Available in: English
- Type: Virtual machine, game engine
- License: MIT License
- Website: https://tic80.com
- Repository: github.com/nesbox/TIC-80

TIC-80 is a free and open-source fantasy video game console for making, playing, and sharing games on a limited platform that mimics the 8-bit systems of the 1980s. It has built-in code, sprite, map, music, and sound effect editors, as well as a command line interface that allow users to develop and edit games within the fantasy console.

The games made in TIC-80 can be exported as virtual game cartridges and bundled for different platforms, including Android, Linux, MacOS, Windows, bare metal Raspberry Pi, Nintendo 3DS, RetroArch, and HTML5 (using WebAssembly). It supports programming languages including JavaScript, MoonScript, and Lua, as well as Ruby, Wren, Fennel, Squirrel, Python and D.

TIC-80 is often compared to PICO-8, a fantasy system which is not open source; both systems are becoming popular with games programmers who are interested in classic home computers and consoles.

== Capabilities ==
As a fantasy console, TIC-80 has some set limitations in terms of graphics and processing power in order to create a "retro-styled" gaming experience. These limitations include a 240 × 136 display; a 16 color palette; 256 8 × 8 sprites; and 4-channel sound. Integrated tools within the "tiny computer" allow developers to edit code, create graphics, write music, and build levels within games.

=== Specifications ===
Resolution	240 × 136 pixels, 16 colors palette.
Input	4 gamepads with 8 buttons / mouse / keyboard.
Sprites	256 foreground sprites and 256 background tiles, 8x8 pixel.
Map	240 × 136 cells, 1920 × 1088 pixels.
Sound	4 channels with configurable waveforms.
Code	Up to 512KB (8 banks each 64KB, even in non-PRO version) of Lua, Ruby, JavaScript, Moon, Fennel, Squirrel, Wren or WebAssembly.
Memory	Up to 272kb of RAM (including 32KB of VRAM).
Bankswitching	Up to 8 banks in cart (PRO version only).

=== Cartridges ===
The TIC-80 is capable of storing and loading back serialized dumps of memory regions using so called cartridges, another 1980s metaphor. Unlike the original ones, which were actual physical objects, the TIC-80 cartridges are just files in .tic format. These can be created by typing "save filename.tic" on the console, and loaded back by typing "load filename.tic". Furthermore, TIC-80 comes with a built-in cartridge browser, called "SURF" (see below). Free and Open Source tools to convert PICO-8 cartridges to TIC-80 cartridges exists, but they aren't perfect.

To push the metaphor one step further, this serialized memory dump can be embedded in a PNG picture (resembling a real physical cartridge). Initially, steganography was used for this; however, this imposed a hard size limit of 96KiB and was vulnerable to unintentional corruption by image editing tools. Recent versions instead store the cartridge data in a caRt ancillary chunk which is unaffected by image editing operations and can store much more data.

=== Color palettes ===
SWEETIE-16
Number	Hexadecimal RGB value	Name
0	#1A1C2C	Black
1	#5D275D	Purple
2	#B13E53	Red
3	#EF7D57	Orange
4	#FFCD75	Yellow
5	#A7F070	Light green
6	#38B764	Green
7	#257179	Dark green
8	#29366F	Dark blue
9	#3B5DC9	Blue
10	#41A6F6	Light blue
11	#73EFF7	Cyan
12	#F4F4F4	White
13	#94B0C2	Light Grey
14	#566C86	Grey
15	#333C57	Dark Grey

== Playing and sharing games ==
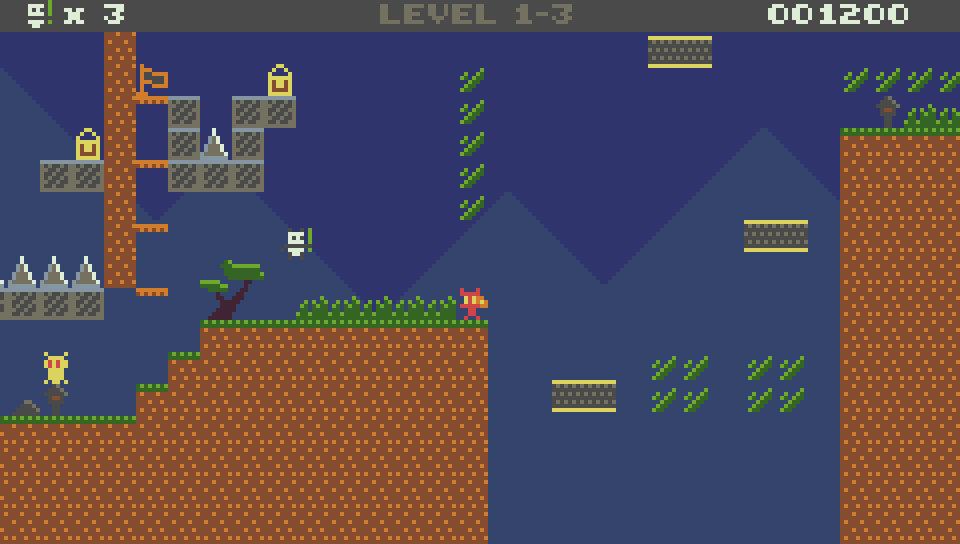
8-Bit Panda, a platformer game for TIC-80

TIC-80 runs on major operating systems including Windows, x86 Linux 32 and 64 bit, Mac OS X, and Android, and can be compiled from source code for other platforms such as Raspberry Pi. "Tic" cartridge files, containing playable versions of the game, are generated using the integrated development tools. There is a large and growing catalog of community-made games available through the TIC-80 web site.

The TIC-80 console has been featured in demo parties such as Outline 2022 in the Netherlands; Lovebyte 2021 online; and a 2018 LINE Fukuoka hackathon in Japan.

== See also ==
- Picotron
- CHIP-8
