= Picotron =

Virtual machine emulating a "fantasy video game console"

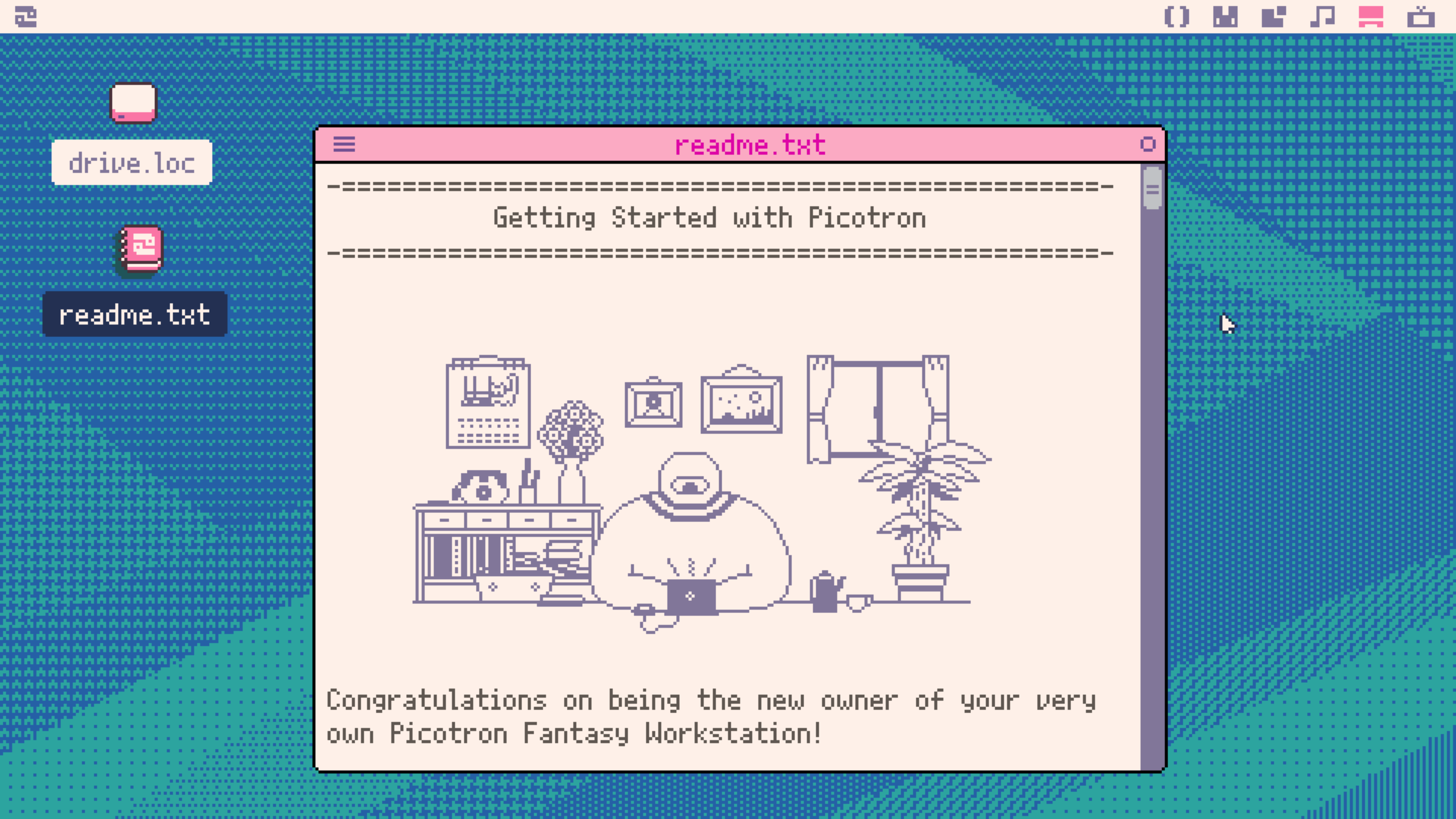
- Screenshot
- Developer: Lexaloffle Games
- Release: 31 December 2022; 3 years ago (WIP); 14 March 2024; 2 years ago (Alpha); 14 March 2026; 5 months ago (Beta)
- Stable release: 0.3.0d2 / 2026; 0 years ago
- Operating system: Web, Windows, Mac OS, Linux
- Platform: PC, Raspberry Pi, HTML5
- Available in: English, Japanese
- Type: Virtual machine, game engine
- License: Proprietary
- Website: www.lexaloffle.com/picotron.php

Picotron is a virtual machine and desktop environment created by Lexaloffle Games. It is a fantasy workstation that is aimed at making retro style video games and mimics the specifications of 16-bit computers of the late 1980s. It is a complement to Lexaloffle's earlier 8-bit inspired PICO-8. The Alpha release of Picotron became available on March 14 (Pi Day), 2024. The Beta release of Picotron (v0.3.0) later became available on March 14, 2026.

It has a virtual toy operating system and built in tools that allow software development, game development and customization of the system itself. It runs on top of Windows, Mac OS, and Linux, with support for Raspberry Pi and export to stand-alone binaries or Web apps planned. Similarly to PICO-8, programs made with Picotron can be shared directly with other Picotron users in a special 256k png cartridge format.

== Capabilities ==
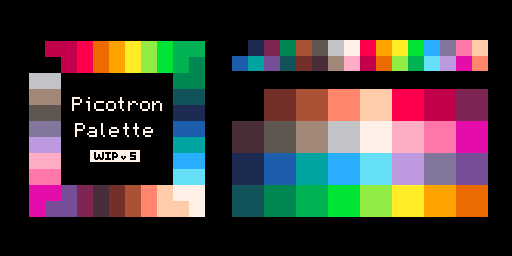
Picotron's WIP default palette (32 colours)

Picotron has an embedded Lua editor compatible with both PICO-8 and Lua 5.4 syntax. It supports 480x270, 240x135, and 160x90 screen modes with default 32 system colors and 64 definable colors in total. For audio, it has a 64-node, 16-channel synth and a 8-channel tracker. Picotron's CPU does 8 MIPS and has 16 MB of RAM.

All of the software for Picotron is written in Lua and can be edited from within the machine itself. System tools including the file browser, code editor, and the terminal are implemented in userland, compiled just-in-time so that changes in source code go into effect immediately. Custom tools can be created from scratch that run in fullscreen workspaces alongside the bundled editors. These additions and the subsequent shift in focus of the machine give Picotron the title of "Workstation" rather than "Console".

Picotron has a similar API to PICO-8, but does not natively support its cartridges due to the virtual machine difference especially depending on the floating point behavior.

Picotron initially had a primitive version of the BBS but did not have all the features of PICO-8's Splore. Lexaloffle Games released Splore for Picotron in January 2026 as part of Picotron 0.2.2.

Unlike the PICO-8, as of 2026, Picotron is currently only available for 64-bit systems. Picotron heavily depends on 64-bit floating-point values, and while many 32-bit systems support emulation of 64-bit floating-point values, such emulation introduces a performance reduction and added complexity.

== Development ==
Development of Picotron started as early as 2017 when Joseph White, better known as zep, and his company Lexaloffle developed an SFX editor for Voxatron, his first console along with PICO-8. Around that time he was asked if he had considered developing a PICO-16, to which he delightedly entertained working on a third console. In 2018 he mentioned that in his free time he "designed a PICO-16 just to remind himself to not make that" and that "PICO-16 does not work at all". The PICO-8 community expressed great interest in the possibility of a 16-bit fantasy console, which convinced zep to develop the third console. He announced "Machine 3" as Picotron the next day on 2021 June 16.

zep started working openly on Picotron after its announcement, occasionally sharing updates via his Twitter account and Lexaloffle BBS blog where he got feedback from the community. On 2022 December 31, he announced Picotron Playground, an early web version of Picotron's runtime and API for users to test the base features. On 2024 March 14, he released the first alpha version of Picotron for purchase.

Picotron is still frequently updated, and has more features planned.

== See also ==
- TIC-80
