= Ryuta Yamamura =

Ryuta Yamamura 山村 隆太
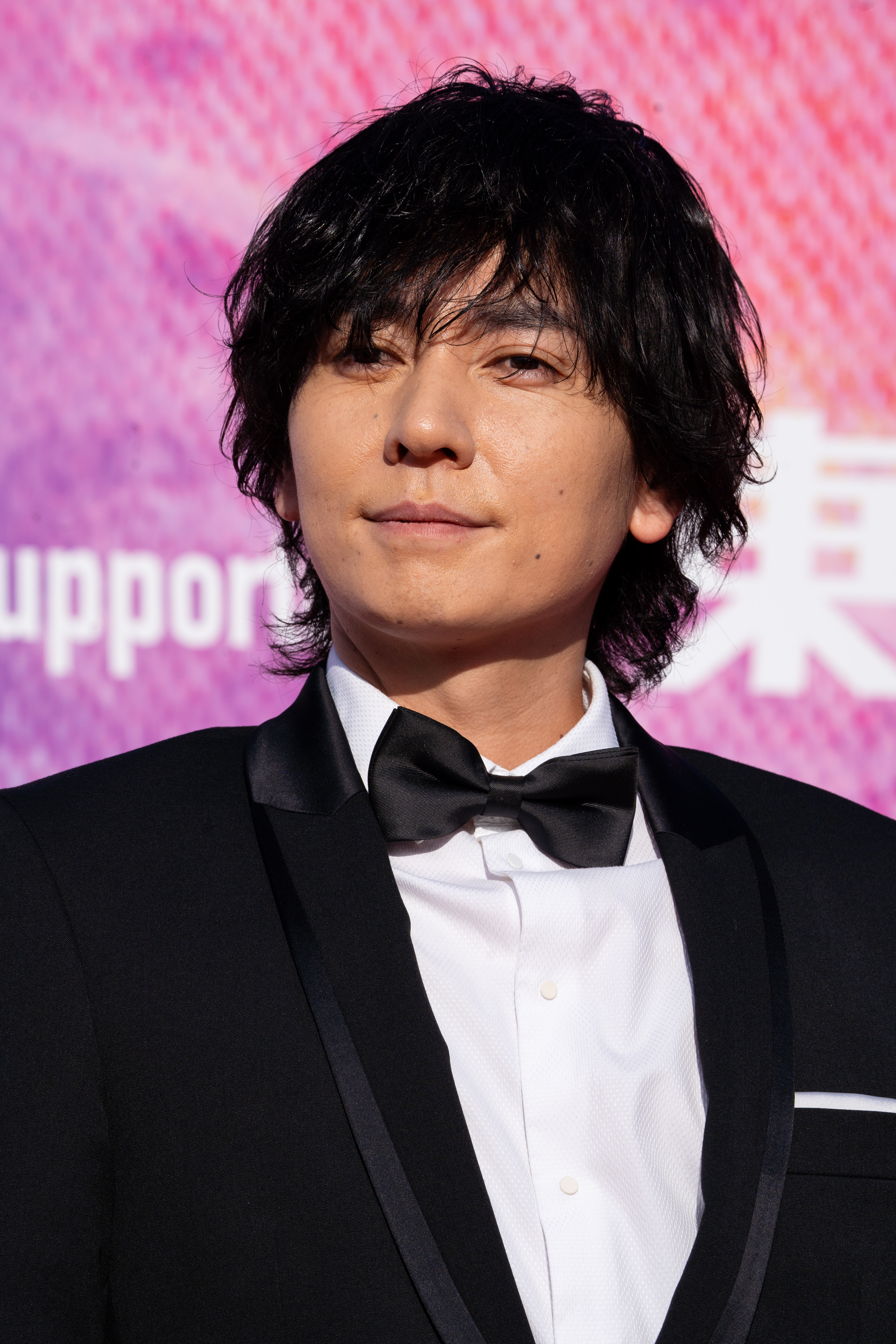

Background information
- Also known as: Ryuta (隆太, Ryūta); Sōri (総理)
- Born: 21 January 1985 (age 41); Matsubara, Osaka, Japan
- Genres: J-pop; rock
- Occupations: Musician; singer; songwriter; lyricist; composer; actor
- Instruments: Vocals; guitar
- Years active: 2007–
- Label: A-Sketch
- Member of: flumpool; The Turtles Japan

Ryuta Yamamura (山村 隆太, Yamamura Ryūta; born 21 January 1985, in Matsubara, Osaka) is a Japanese musician, singer, songwriter, lyricist, composer and actor. He is the vocalist of the flumpool and The Turtles Japan.

== Overview ==
- Yamamura wrote most of flumpool's songs.
- The equipment he used is a Gibson Les Paul Special.

== Biography ==
- During his college years Yamamura performed in the streets along with two members which included flumpool member Genki Amakawa.
- He underwent throat polyp surgery in June 2010.
- Although the polyps were discovered when the band made their debut, Yamamura continued music activities after resting. However he checked that his throat was in an uncomfortable sensation during a live rehearsal in February 2010, it was confirmed that the polyp was enlarged, and due to this he decided to take the remedy for a month after the tour with his intention. His postoperative live concert was the Setstock '10.
- Yamamura appeared just by himself in Mobage's new television advertisement called Donna Mirai ni mo Ai wa aru in June 2011. This was his first solo activity.
- In November 2014, Yamamura, along with Seiji Kameda and Kazuki Sakai, formed the band The Turtles Japan and started with the single "It's Alright!" The song became the theme song became the theme song of Tokyo Broadcasting Systems's Count Down TV for October and November.
- On 26 June 2016, Yamamura announced that he married a non-celebrity woman.
- He made his acting debut as the lead role co-starring with Mariya Nishiuchi in Fuji Television's Getsuku drama Totsuzen desuga, Ashita Kekkon shimasu in January 2017.

== Music instruments he used ==
- Fender Classic Series '60s Telecaster (used until around 2010)
- Fender Custom Shop 1959 Telecaster (Currently used in the music video of "Touch")
- Gibson Les Paul Custom
- Rickenbacker Les Paul (red)
- K. Yairi Akogi

== Filmography ==
=== TV dramas ===
Year	Title	Role	Network	Notes	Ref.
2017	Totsuzen desuga, Ashita Kekkon shimasu	Nanami Ryu	Fuji TV		

=== Film ===
Year	Title	Role	Notes	Ref.
2024	Tea for Three	Jun'ya Manaka		

== See also ==
- flumpool
