= Unreal (Flumpool album) =

Studio album by Flumpool
- Released: November 19, 2008
- Recorded: 2008
- Genre: J-pop
- Length: 48:53
- Label: A-Sketch

Flumpool chronology
Unreal (2008)	What's Flumpool!? (2009)

Professional ratings
Review scores
Source	Rating
AllMusic	3.5/5 stars

Unreal is the first mini-album released by Japanese rock band flumpool on November 19, 2008. Its cover is a nude photography, describing the band's members as "dolls". It was certified Platinum by the Recording Industry Association of Japan (RIAJ) for shipment of 250,000 copies.

== Track listing ==
Unreal
No.	Title	Length
1.	"Hana ni Nare" (花になれ)	6:25
2.	"Harukaze" (春風)	4:31
3.	"Over the Rain: Hikari no Hashi" (Over The Rain ～ひかりの橋～)	4:38
4.	"388859"	4:29
5.	"Hello"	4:20
6.	"Labo"	4:09
7.	"Lost"	4:39
8.	"Mirai" (未来)	4:31
9.	"Hana ni Nare" (花になれ (Instrumental))	6:28
10.	"Over the Rain: Hikari no Hashi" (Over The Rain ～ひかりの橋～ (Instrumental))	4:38
Total length:		48:53

== Charts ==
Release	Oricon Albums Chart	Peak position	First week sales	Total sales
November 19, 2008	Daily Charts	2	–	241,600
November 19, 2008	Weekly Charts	2	110,832	241,600
November 19, 2008	Monthly Charts (November 2008)	5	–	241,600
November 19, 2008	Yearly Charts (2008)	63	–	241,600
