= Fantasia of Life Stripe =

- Limited Edition Premium Package Cover

Studio album by Flumpool
- Released: January 26, 2011
- Recorded: 2010
- Genre: J-pop
- Length: 70:42
- Label: A-Sketch

Flumpool chronology
What's flumpool!? (2009)	Fantasia of Life Stripe (2011)

Fantasia of Life Stripe is the second full album by Japanese rock band Flumpool. The album was released on January 26, 2011 in Japan under their record label A-Sketch in two editions: a limited edition premium package and a normal package. The album was certified gold by the RIAJ in January 2011.

== Album information ==
Both editions contain fourteen tracks; however, the limited edition premium package comes with a 48-page booklet and a special CD titled Fantezie muzicală de curcubeul vieţii (Fantasia of Life Stripe~Bloody Remix~). This CD is a remixed version of the album by a project called Red Dracul Scar Tissue.

The title of the album is derived from the theme of the album. The word "Fantasia" represents the songs in the album which are created freely without deciding on the rules and styles of creating them. The words "Life Stripe" represent an artwork of the actions done in daily lives which are replaced with 21 colors.

=== Songs ===
Fantasia of Life Stripe contains three of the band's previously released singles: "Zanzō", "reboot~Akiramenai Uta/Nagareboshi" and "Kimi ni Todoke". "Zanzō" was used as the theme song for the second season of the drama Bloody Monday. "reboot~Akiramenai Uta~" was used as a support song of Japanese television network NTV's coverage of the FIFA World Cup. "Kimi ni Todoke" was used as the theme song for the movie with the same title. The song "Snowy Nights Serenade~Kokoro Made mo Tsunagitai~" included in the album is the original version of the song "Snowy Nights Serenade~Kokoro Made mo Tsunagitai~ Xmas ver." which was released in December 2010 as a single limited to the members of the band's mobile fan club.

"two of us", the second track, is being used as the theme song for the show "Ainori 2".

"Snowy Nights Serenade~Kokoro Made mo Tsunagitai~", the fourth track, was used as the ending theme song for December for the show "Onegai!Ranking".

== Track listing ==
All lyrics written by vocalist, Ryuta Yamamura.

CD
No.	Title	Music	Arranger(s)	Length
1.	"Kimi ni Todoke" (君に届け, Delivered to You)	Kazuki Sakai	Tamai Kenji, Momota Rui	5:23
2.	"two of us"	Kazuki Sakai	Tamai Kenji, Momota Rui	4:48
3.	"reboot~Akiramenai Uta~" (reboot～あきらめない詩～, reboot～Do not give up poetry～)	Kazuki Sakai	Tamai Kenji, Momota Rui	5:16
4.	"Snowy Nights Serenade~Kokoro Made mo Tsunagitai~" (Snowy Nights Serenade～心までも繋ぎたい～)	Kazuki Sakai	Tamai Kenji, Momota Rui	5:48
5.	"Tōkyō Aika" (東京哀歌, Tōkyō Lamentations)	Kazuki Sakai	Tamai Kenji, Momota Rui	4:45
6.	"Music Surfer"	Kazuki Sakai	Tamai Kenji, Momota Rui	4:06
7.	"Boku wa Koko ni Iru" (僕はここにいる, I'm here)	Kazuki Sakai	Tamai Kenji, Momota Rui	4:55
8.	"Kimi no Tame no 100 no Moshi mo" (君のための100のもしも)	Kazuki Sakai	Tamai Kenji, Momota Rui	5:48
9.	"Kono Jidai wo Ikinuku Tame ni" (この時代を生き抜くために)	Kazuki Sakai	Tamai Kenji, Momota Rui	4:00
10.	"Nagareboshi" (流れ星, Shooting Star)	Kazuki Sakai	Tamai Kenji, Momota Rui	5:34
11.	"Giruto" (ギルト, Guilt)	Kazuki Sakai	Tamai Kenji, Momota Rui	4:56
12.	"Shiori" (しおり, Bookmark)	Kazuki Sakai	Tamai Kenji, Momota Rui	4:36
13.	"Vega~Kako to Mirai no Hokkyokusei~" (ベガ～過去と未来の北極星～)	Genki Amakawa	Tamai Kenji, Momota Rui	5:00
14.	"Zanzō" (残像, Afterimage)	Kazuki Sakai	Tamai Kenji, Momota Rui	5:47

Special CD
No.	Title	Music	Remixed and engineered by	Length
1.	"Pentru tine (Kimi ni Todoke)" (Penturu tine (君に届け))	Kazuki Sakai	Takahiro Izutani	4:58
2.	"Noi doi (two of us)"	Kazuki Sakai	Takahiro Izutani	4:16
3.	"reboot~nu mă las de poezia asta~ (reboot~Akiramenai Uta~)" (rebuuto~nu ma rasu de poejia asuta~ (reboot～あきらめない詩～))	Kazuki Sakai	Takahiro Izutani	4:07
4.	"Serenadă de noapte înzăpezită~vreau să fiu cu tine~ (Snowy Nights Serenade~Kokoro Made mo Tsunagitai~)" (Serenaada de noapute enzapajita~vurau sa fiu ku tine~ (Snowy Nights Serenade～心までも繋ぎたい～))	Kazuki Sakai	Takahiro Izutani	5:55
5.	"Elegie pentru Tokyo (Tōkyō Elegy)" (Erejie penturu Toukyou (東京哀歌))	Kazuki Sakai	Takahiro Izutani	4:56
6.	"Surfer de muzică (Music Surfer)" (Saafaa de Mujika)	Kazuki Sakai	Takahiro Izutani	5:47
7.	"Sunt aici (Boku wa Koko ni Iru)" (Suntu aichi (僕はここにいる))	Kazuki Sakai	Takahiro Izutani	5:25
8.	"Spun 'daca' 100 de ori pentru tine (Kimi no Tame no 100 no Moshi mo)" (Supun "daka" osuta de ori penturu tine (君のための100のもしも))	Kazuki Sakai	Takahiro Izutani	5:35
9.	"Să supravieţuiesti acum (Kono Jidai wo Ikinuku Tame ni)" (Sa suupuravietsuesuti akumu (この時代を生き抜くために))	Kazuki Sakai	Takahiro Izutani	5:07
10.	"Stea căzătoare (Nagareboshi)" (Sutaa kazatoaru (流れ星))	Kazuki Sakai	Takahiro Izutani	5:27
11.	"Vină (Guilt)" (Vina (ギルト))	Kazuki Sakai	Takahiro Izutani	4:34
12.	"Semn de carte (Shiori)" (Semun de karute (しおり))	Kazuki Sakai	Takahiro Izutani	4:36
13.	"Vega~Polaris de trecut şi viitor~ (Vega~Kako to Mirai no Hokkyokusei~)" (Vega~Porarisu de turekutu shi viitoru~ (ベガ～過去と未来の北極星～))	Genki Amakawa	Takahiro Izutani	4:20
14.	"Urmă (Zanzō)" (Uruma (残像))	Kazuki Sakai	Takahiro Izutani	4:44

== Charts and sales ==
Chart	Peak position	Sales total
Oricon Daily Chart	2	26,173
Oricon Weekly Chart	2	81,238
Oricon Monthly Chart	5	81,238
Oricon Total Sales		117,808
