= Flumpool =

Japanese rock band

flumpool
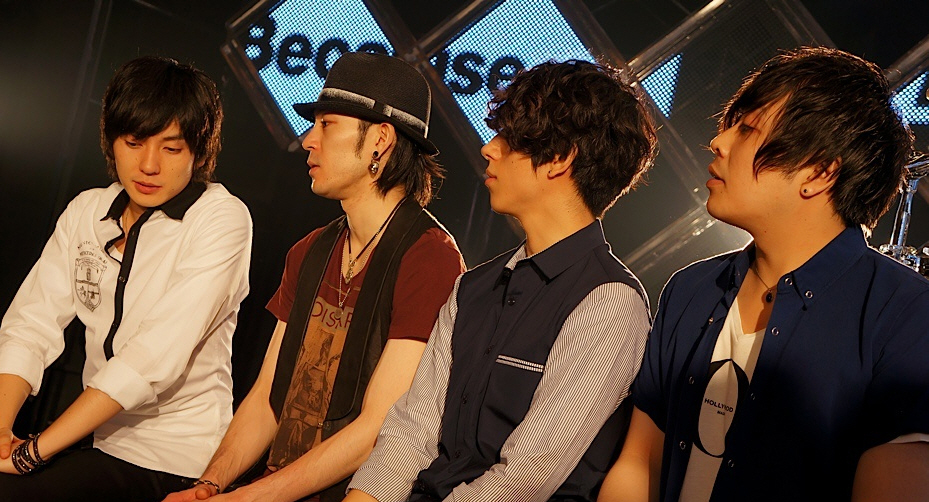
- flumpool in May 2013.

Background information
- Origin: Osaka, Japan
- Genre: Pop rock
- Years active: 2007–present
- Labels: Sonic Form (2007); Antwork (2008); A-Sketch (2008–present)
- Members: Ryuta Yamamura - Vocals, guitar Kazuki Sakai - Guitar; Genki Amakawa - Bass guitar Seiji Ogura - Drums, leader
- Website: www.flumpool.jp

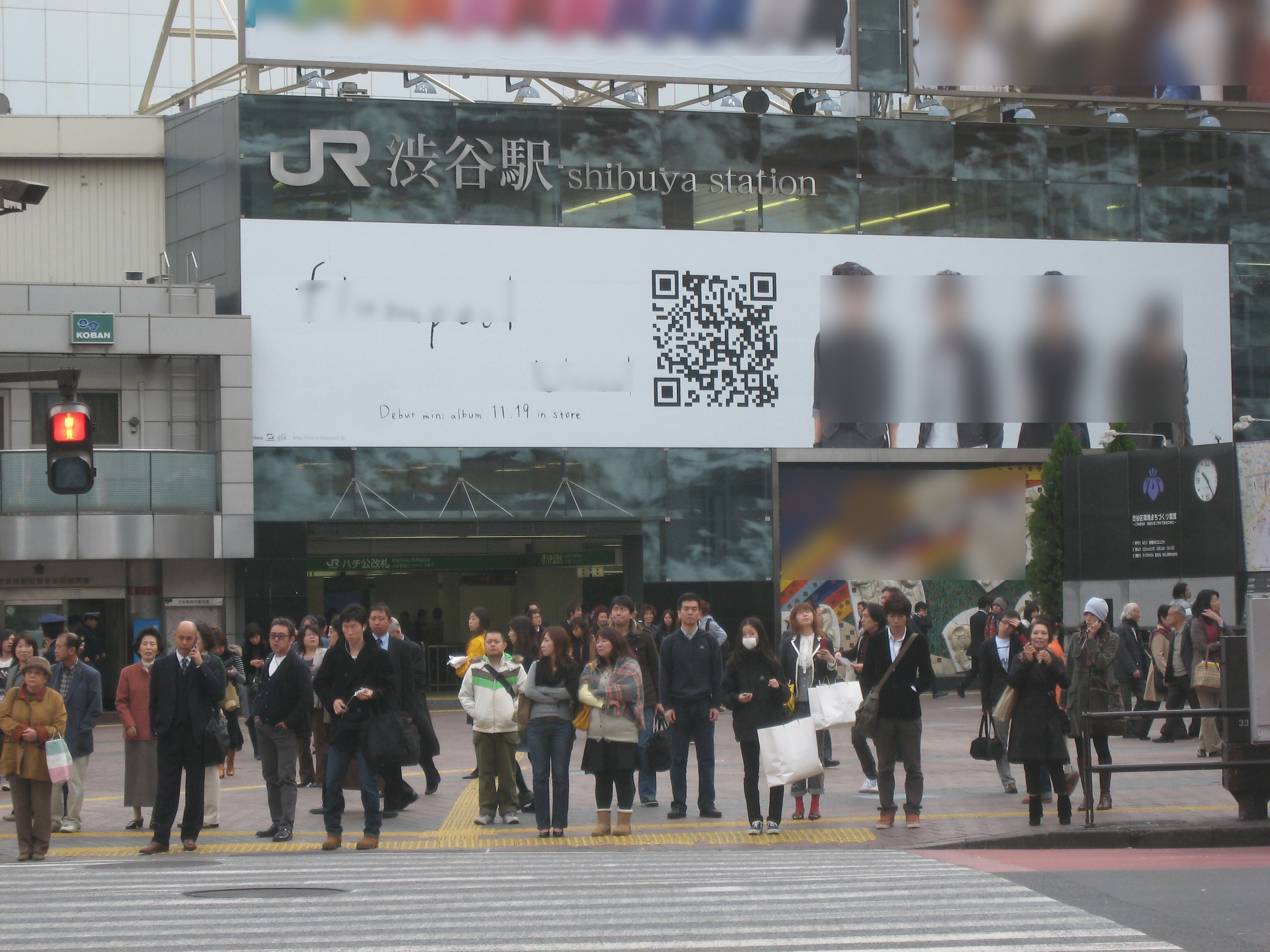
A giant 2D barcode on a billboard advertisement in Shibuya. People may point their cellphone's camera at it to access the website whose URL is coded in the barcode. It advertises Flumpool's debut album Unreal.

Flumpool (stylized as flumpool) are a Japanese rock band. The band, originally from Osaka Prefecture, was formed in January 2007. The band's name is a portmanteau of the words four (from the number of members in the band), lump, and pool. Thus, the name could be interpreted to mean "collective mass of four" or a "quartet".

On 1 October 2008, the band released a download single named "Hana ni Nare" (花になれ; "Become a Flower"). Their debut mini-album (though its length is over 48 minutes), Unreal was released on 10 November 2008. Unreal served Platinum certification from the RIAJ for its shipment of 250,000 copies.

== History ==
=== 2002: cube ===
In 2002, Yamamura, along with his childhood friends, Sakai and Amakawa, formed an acoustic unit named 309. Later, when a support drummer joined them, they formed a band. From then, they changed their name to cube. Yamamura plays acoustic guitar as well as does most vocals. Sakai also plays acoustic guitar while Amakawa plays bass guitar. Furthermore, they issued four independent CD productions.

=== 2007: flumpool ===
In January 2007, Ogura joined the band as the drummer. On 13 January, the band's name was changed to flumpool. They held live gigs in Osaka-jō Hall and "live houses" around Osaka. On 24 July, the production of an independent single titled "Mirai Kanai" (ミライカナイ; "One's Future") was announced.

=== 2008: Debut ===
On 25 June, "Mirai Kanai" went up for sale on indiesmusic.com. In July, the promotional video of "labo" was made. The video was ranked number one on Access Rankings. On 27 August, both Tower Records and Tsutaya held the 5,000 limited copies of the independent trial single, "labo". On 1 September, they became the Campaign Song Artist for the telephone service, au KDDI "LISMO". On September 20, their song, "Hana ni Nare" was used for the campaign.

On 5 September, the band was featured on Fuji TV's Mezamashi TV and performed on television for the first time. On October 1, they released "Hana ni Nare" (花になれ; "Become a Flower") as their first digital single with Amuse, Inc. under the newly created sub-label A-Sketch. In just ten days, the song reached 1,000,000 downloads (now 2,000,000). On November 5, they released their second digital single, "Over the Rain (Hikari no Hashi)" (Over the Rain～ひかりの橋～; "Over the Rain (Bridge of Light)"). The song was used as the theme song of TBS drama, Bloody Monday. On the same month, they released their first mini-album, Unreal on the 19th. It reached No. 2 on Oricon weekly albums chart.

=== 2009: What's flumpool!? ===
On 19 February, the band launched their first nationwide tour, "flumpool tour 2009『UNREAL』" with seven performances in six cities. Later in that month, the band released their first major single, "Hoshi ni Negai o" (星に願いを; "Wish Upon A Star") and reached No. 2 on Oricon weekly singles chart.

Their second single was released on 1 July, entitled "MW (Dear Mr. & Mrs. Picaresque)/Natsu Dive" (MW ～Dear Mr. & Ms. ピカレスク～／夏Dive; "MW (Dear Mr. & Mrs. Picaresque)/Summer Dive") and reached No. 3 on Oricon weekly singles chart. On the same day, their first Live DVD, "『How did we feel then?~flumpool tour 2009 "Unreal" Live at Shibuya Club Quattro~』" was released and reached No. 1 on Oricon weekly Music DVD Chart.

A week after the releases, the band began their second nationwide tour, "flumpool tour 2009 "Unclose"" at 18 venues. The tour comprised a total of 19 performances.

On 14 October, the band released their third digital single, "Frame". On 18 November, they released yet another digital single, "Mitsumeteitai".

The band released their first full album, What's flumpool!? on 23 December and reached No. 2 on the Oricon weekly albums chart.

=== 2010: Vocalist's polypectomy and year-end arena lives ===
On 3 February, the band released their third single, "Zanzō" and reached No. 3 on Oricon weekly singles chart. The song was used as the theme song of the second season of TBS drama, Bloody Monday. On the same month, they released their second live DVD, "flumpool tour 2009『Unclose』Special!! LIVE at Nippon Budokan". It also reached No. 1 on Oricon weekly Music DVD chart.

On 5 March, the band started their third nationwide tour, "flumpool tour 2010「What's flumpool!?~Love&Piiiis Kids Show!!~」" at 40 venues and 46 performances in total. The tour lasted three months.

On 14 March, the band released their first artist photobook, "fourbond".

It was made known on 29 April that flumpool's vocalist, Ryuta Yamamura would undergo polypectomy in June. On 5 May, Ryuta Yamamura announced on "flumpool ROCKS!", flumpool's corner of the radio program TOKYO FM's SCHOOL OF ROCK!, that he will undergo polypectomy after their last concert of the third tour in Okinawa and spend about a month resting.

The band released their fourth major single entitled "reboot~Akiramenai Uta~/Nagareboshi" (reboot～あきらめない詩～／流れ星; "reboot~Don't Give Up Song~/Shooting Star") on 23 June. It reached No. 2 on Oricon weekly singles chart. The song, "reboot~Akiramenai Uta~" was used as a support song of Japanese television network NTV's coverage of the FIFA World Cup.

As of 7 July, Yamamura made a Tanabata return after surgery at "flumpool ROCKS!". On 1 August, flumpool performed at "SETSTOCK'10" which was held in Hiroshima. It was their first live after the return of their vocalist.

It was announced on 14 July that the band would sing the theme song entitled "Kimi ni Todoke" (君に届け; "Reaching you") of the movie Kimi ni Todoke. The song "Kimi ni Todoke" was released as a single on 29 September. It debuted at No. 2 on the Oricon weekly singles chart. All five major single releases to date have made it to top three on the Oricon weekly singles chart.

The band released a Christmas DVD single entitled "Snowy Nights Serenade~Kokoro Made mo Tsunagitai~" (Snowy Nights Serenade～心までも繋ぎたい～). The release is limited to the members of POOLSIDE, the band's mobile fan club. This first time ever members limited release is a premium package which includes a Special DVD encompassing flumpool's "gratitude" and an original calendar (2011). The song "Snowy Nights Serenade～心までも繋ぎたい～(Xmas ver.)" was the main theme of their year-end arena lives which were held on December 18 and 19 at Osaka-jō Hall and on 25 and 26 December at Yokohama Arena. They expressed their gratitude to their fans for staying with them in the year since the opening of POOLSIDE by turning the words they can't convey very well into this song.

On 31 December, flumpool attended the 61st NHK Kōhaku Uta Gassen, performing on the show for the second time.

=== 2011–2012: Fantasia of Life Stripe ===
flumpool held a live tour with rock band, Nico Touches the Walls in January in 3 cities.

The band released their second full album on 26 January. The title of the album, Fantasia of Life Stripe was revealed through a CM, aired on 28 November 2010. Details of the album were disclosed on 29 November 2010 on their official website. The album reached No. 2 on the Oricon weekly albums chart.

The band were in charge of the set piece for the Junior High School section of the 78th NHK National Music Contest. A choral composition of the set piece was scheduled to be announced in March. The theme of the contest is "Companions". The title was later announced as "Akashi" (証). "Akashi" was NHK's "Minna no Uta" music broadcast in August to September.

The band released their third Live DVD entitled "3rd Live DVD flumpool Live at YOKOHAMA ARENA!! Special Live 2010「Snowy Nights Serenade~Kokoro Made mo Tsunagitai~」" (3rd Live DVD flumpool Live at YOKOHAMA ARENA!! Special Live 2010「Snowy Nights Serenade～心までも繋ぎたい～」) on April 6. The DVD reached No. 3 on Oricon weekly Music DVD chart.

The band started their fourth nationwide tour entitled "Fantasia of Life Stripe~Bokutachi wa Koko ni Iru~" (『Fantasia of Life Stripe～僕達はここにいる～』) from April in 10 major cities and 19 performances. Due to the 2011 Tōhoku earthquake and tsunami, the band kicked off their tour on 9 April in Fukuoka instead of Yokosuga, Kanagawa on 4 April. The two shows which were scheduled in Yokosuga, Kanagawa are replaced by concerts at Kanagawa Kenmin Hall in Kanagawa on 3 and 4 June. The concerts scheduled 7 and 8 May in Sendai, Miyagi was cancelled. The band will hold a live at Zepp Sendai on 12 August instead. The title of the live is "4th tour 2011 "Fantasia of Life Stripe ～僕達はここにいる～" Zepp Sendai Special Live". In the aftermath of the 11 March earthquake and tsunami in Japan, the band's members and their record label A-Sketch made a donation of 10 million yen to the Japanese Red Cross as part of the fund raising campaign by their agency Amuse. The band will also donate some of the revenue from sales of concert tickets and official goods. They also set up donation boxes at each concert and encourage donations from the crowds.

In May, it was announced that the band would sing the theme song for the "Rugby World Cup 2011".

In June, flumpool's vocalist, Ryuta Yamamura appeared solo in the CM for the mobile game site "Mobage". The song used in the CM is the band's new song which will be released as a double a-side single entitled "Donna Mirai ni mo Ai wa Aru/Touch" (どんな未来にも愛はある/Touch). The song "Touch" is used as the tie-up song for "au AQUOS PHONE IS11SH" commercial. The single was released on 27 July.

=== 2012–present: experience ===
In December 2012, flumpool released an album titled experience. With the album they made a debut into Taiwan. With a Chinese cover 証明 written by Mayday Ashin.

In September 2014, Flumpool makes a Single for Indonesian Tokusatsu Series Satria Garuda BIMA-X titled 'Let Tomorrow be'.

On December 6, 2017, flumpool announced that it was going on indefinite hiatus. Vocalist Ryuta Yamamura was diagnosed with functional vocal disorder, forcing him to stop his activities and seek treatment.

On January 13, 2019, Yamamura announced that he had recovered and flumpool would be resuming activities. They released the single HELP on May 22, and announced their ninth concert tour Command Shift Z would start in September and include Hong Kong tour dates.

On Aug 24, 2024, flumpool performed at Super Slippa 13, a music festival held at the Taipei Arena. Vocalist Ryuta also collaborated with GLAY's Teru and Mayday to perform the song OAOA.

== Band members ==
- Ryuta Yamamura (山村 隆太, Yamamura Ryūta) (born January 21, 1985, Osaka)— vocals, guitar
- Kazuki Sakai (阪井 一生, Sakai Kazuki) (born February 26, 1985, Osaka) — guitar
- Genki Amakawa (尼川 元気, Amakawa Genki) (born November 27, 1984, Osaka) — bass guitar
- Seiji Ogura (小倉 誠司, Ogura Seiji) (born February 27, 1984, Hyōgo) — drums, leader

== Discography ==
=== Albums ===
Year	Title	Weekly peak	Yearly rank	Debut week sales (copies)	Overall sales (copies)	Certification
2008	Unreal: Released: November 19, 2008; First mini-album	2	63	110,832	246,617	Platinum
2009	What's Flumpool!?: Released: December 23, 2009; First studio album	2	47	90,102	159,879	Gold
2011	Fantasia of Life Stripe: Released: January 26, 2011; 2nd studio album	2	—	83,310	118,488	Gold
2012	experience: Released: December 12, 2012; 3rd studio album	5	—	—	—	Gold
2016	Egg: Released: March 16, 2016; 4th studio album	2	—	—	—	—
2022	A Spring Breath: Released: March 16, 2022; 5th studio album	14	—	—	—	—
2025	Shape the Water: Released: March 5, 2025; 6th studio album	19	—	4,522	—	—

=== Compilation albums ===
Year	Title	Weekly peak	Yearly rank	Debut week sales (copies)	Overall sales (copies)	Certification
2014	The Best 2008-2014「MONUMENT」: Released: May 21, 2014; First compilation album	3	80	41,295	61,482	—

=== Singles ===
Year	Title	Oricon Singles Chart			Billboard Japan Hot 100	Album
Year	Title	Peak	Sales (copies)		Billboard Japan Hot 100	Album
Year	Title	Debut week	Debut week	Overall	Billboard Japan Hot 100	Album
2008	"Mirai Kanai" (ミライカナイ): Indies debut single; Released: June 25, 2008	—	—	—	—	Unreal
2008	"labo": 2nd Indie single; Released: August 27, 2008	—	—	—	—	Unreal
2008	"Hana ni Nare" (花になれ): First digital single; Released: 1 October 2008; au KDDI "LISMO" campaign song.; September 2008, Spaceshower TV's Power Push song	Digital released			64	Unreal
2008	"Over the Rain (Hikari no Hashi)" (Over the Rain 〜ひかりの橋〜): 2nd digital single; Released: 5 November 2008; Theme song for the TBS drama Bloody Monday.	Digital released			—	Unreal
2009	"Hoshi ni Negai o" (星に願いを, Wish Upon A Star): Major debut single; Released: February 25, 2009	2	42,203	66,546	44	What's Flumpool!?
2009	"MW (Dear Mr. & Mrs. Picaresque)/Natsu Dive" (MW ～Dear Mr. & Ms. ピカレスク～／夏Dive): 2nd major single; Released: July 1, 2009	3	31,825	49,146	3	What's Flumpool!?
2009	"Frame" (フレイム): 3rd digital single; Released: October 14, 2009	Digital released			—	What's Flumpool!?
2009	"Mitsumeteitai" (見つめていたい): 4th digital single; Released: November 18, 2009	Digital released			—	What's Flumpool!?
2010	"Zanzō" (残像, Afterimage): 3rd major single; Released: February 3, 2010; Theme song for Bloody Monday 2	3	31,020	46,936	32	Fantasia of Life Stripe
2010	"reboot~Akiramenai Uta~/Nagareboshi" (reboot～あきらめない詩～／流れ星): 4th major single; Released: June 23, 2010; Support song for NTV's coverage of the FIFA World Cup	2	35,435	43,413	18	Fantasia of Life Stripe
2010	"Kimi ni Todoke" (君に届け): 5th major single; Released: September 29, 2010; Theme song for Kimi ni Todoke	2	38,960	59,739	98	Fantasia of Life Stripe
2011	"Donna Mirai ni mo Ai wa Aru/Touch" (どんな未来にも愛はある／Touch): 6th major single; Released: July 27, 2011; "Song with Mobage" TV CM Song/"au AQUOS PHONE IS11SH" TV CM Song	6	32,029	41,467	36	
2011	"Akashi" (証): 7th major single; Released: September 7, 2011	4	34,167	48,419	6	
2011	"Present": 8th major single; Released: December 7, 2011	6	—	TBA	—	
2012	"Because...I am": 9th major single; Released: July 11, 2012	3	—	TBA	—	experience
2012	"Answer": 10th major single; Released: November 7, 2012; Theme song for Drama Resident – 5-nin no Kenshui	4	—	TBA	—	experience
2013	"Taisetsuna Mono wa Kimi Igai ni Miataranakute / Binetsu Refrain" (大切なものは君以外に見当たらなくて/微熱リフレイン): 11th major single; Released: July 3, 2013	5	—	—	—	
2013	"Tsuyoku Hakanaku/Belief-Haru Wo Matsu Kimi He" (強く儚く / Belief 〜春を待つ君へ〜): 12th major single; Released: October 2, 2013	6	—	—	—	
2015	"Natsu Yo Tomenaide/You're Romantic" (夏よ止めないで ～You're Romantic～): 13th major single; Released: August 5, 2015	7	—	—	11	
2016	"Yoru wa Nemurerukai?" (夜は眠れるかい?): 14th major single; Released: February 10, 2016; Opening theme song for Ajin: Demi-Human	3	—	—	8	
2016	"FREE YOUR MIND": 15th major single; Released: November 2, 2016					
2017	"Last Call" (ラストコール): 16th major single; Released: March 15, 2017; Theme song for the Live-action Film of Sagrada Reset					
2017	"Toutoi" (とうとい): 17th major single; Released: December 26, 2017					
2019	"HELP": 18th major single; Released: May 22, 2019	5	11,299	—	—	
2020	"Subarashiki Uso" (素晴らしき嘘): 19th major single; Released: February 26, 2020; Theme song for drama Shiranakuteiikoto	13	7,154			

=== DVDs ===
Year	Title	Weekly Chart	Debut Week Sales (copies)	Overall Sales (copies)
2009	How did we feel then? (flumpool Tour 2009 "Unreal" Live at Shibuya Club Quattro): Released: July 1, 2009	1	11,623	13,400
2010	flumpool tour 2009 "Unclose" SPECIAL LIVE at NIPPON BUDOKAN: Released: February 24, 2010	1	14,013	17,686
2011	flumpool Live at YOKOHAMA ARENA!! Special Live 2010 『Snowy Nights Serenade~Kokoro Made mo Tsunagitai~』: Released: April 6, 2011	3	16,670	21,438
2012	Live DVD『flumpool Special Live 2011「Present～Arigato Matsuri! Konnya wa utao! Odoritsukuso!～」 at Saitama super arena』: Released: April 1, 2012	—	—	—
2013	flumpool Special Live 2013 "experience" at YOKOHAMA ARENA: Released: April 24, 2013	8	—	—
2013	flumpool 5th Anniversary Special Live "For our 1,826 days & your 43,824 hours" at Nippon Budokan: Released: December 25, 2013	33	—	—
2014	flumpool 5th Anniversary tour 2014 "MOMENT" ARENA SPECIAL at YOKOHAMA ARENA: Released: December 3, 2014	8	—	—

== Books ==
Year	Title
2009	flumpool virginal year: Released: December 19, 2009
2010	fourbond: Released: March 14, 2010

== Radio ==
- SPEAK OUT! (J-WAVE) (2009.01.02 - )
- SCHOOL OF LOCK! Hana no Keibiin flumpool LOCKS! (SCHOOL OF LOCK! ハナの警備員 flumpool LOCKS!) (Tokyo FM, Wednesdays 23:05-23:30) (2009.10.07 - Present)

== Awards and nominations ==
Billboard Japan Music Awards

Year	Nominee / work	Award	Result
2010	Unreal	King of the Year 2009	Won

MTV Video Music Awards Japan

Year	Nominee / work	Award	Result
2010	Dear Mr. & Ms. Picaresque (from MW film)	Best Video from a Film	Nominated
2011	Kimi ni Todoke (from Kimi ni Todoke film)	Best Video from a Film	Nominated

== See also ==
- Japanese rock
