= Whiffenpoof (disambiguation) =

A whiffenpoof is an imaginary animal.

It can also refer to:

- The Whiffenpoofs, a music group at Yale University
- Whiffenpoof Fish, a fictional fish in the operetta Little Nemo
- A stereotypical student at Yale University

== See also ==
- Eoörnis pterovelox gobiensis, a fictional bird with the common name Woofen-poof
