= Minna no Uta =

Japanese TV and radio program

- Minna no Uta logo from before 1995. The logo has never changed since it started broadcast.

みんなのうた
- Genre: Music
- Anime television series
- Directed by: Various
- Studio: Various
- Original network: NHK
- Original run: April 3, 1961 – present

Minna no Uta (みんなのうた), lit. 'Everyone's Songs' (English title: Songs for Everyone), is a five-minute NHK TV and radio program which is broadcast several times daily in Japan. The program started on April 3, 1961. It is one of NHK's long-running programs.

The program is generally used as filler between programs. While many of the episodes are aimed at children, a large percentage are not, so the program enjoys a wide audience.

The program is used to introduce new songs from popular and new singers, as well as to highlight the talents of various animators and directors. A list of upcoming and currently airing episodes is listed monthly in magazines such as Animage and Newtype.

== Songs introduced on Minna no Uta ==
Listed alphabetically by title, with the artist or group in parentheses.

=== 0–9 ===
- "3-D Tengoku" (Psy-S)
- "44 Hiki no Neko" (Tokyo Hōsō Jidō Gasshōdan)

=== A ===
- "Aa Okashii ne" (Tokyo Jidō Gasshōdan)
- "After man" (Akemi Okamura)
- "Ahiru no Gyōretsu" (The Shaderacks, Tokyo Arakawa Shōnen Gasshōtai)
- "Ahiru to Shōjo" (Kurumi Kobata)
- "Ai Dattan Da yo" (Kōji Tamaki)
- "Ai ni Iku no." (Tomoe Shinohara)
- "Ai no Tabidachi" (Anna Saeki)
- "Aiko desho" (Yūki Kidō, Hibari Jidō Gasshōdan)
- "Aitsu no Hang Glider" (Mieko Nishijima)
- "Aji no Hiraki no Sando Kasa" (Hiromi Yamashita)
- "Aka-chan" (Mitsuko Horie)
- "Akai Bōshi" (Satoko Shimonari)
- "Akai Hana Shiro Hana" (Vickies)
- "Akai Hoshi Aoi Hoshi: Tenmon Karat no Hoshi kara" (Saori Yuki)
- "Akai Ito" (Yōko Seri)
- "Akai Jitensha" (hana*hana)
- "Akai Sarafan" (Naoko Ken)
- "Akaoni to Aooni no Tango" (Isao Bitō)
- "Aki Monogatari" (Kiyohiko Ozaki)
- "Akikaze ni Nosete" (Ritsuko Ōwada, Hiromi Okazaki)
- "Akikaze no Promenade" (Fumio Yamasawa)
- "Akisutozeneko" (Akisutozeniko!)
- "Akiuta" (Senri Ōe)
- "Alice no Kisetsu" (Chikako Sawada)
- "Amaryllis" (Mieko Hirota, Singing Angels)
- "Ame ga Sora kara Fureba" (Hitoshi Komura)
- "Ame no Ten Ten" (Naoko Kawai)
- "Ame no Yūenchi" (Mie Nakao)
- "Ame nochi Special" (Mariko Kōda)
- "Anata ga Mieru" (Tea for Three)
- "Ano Hashi Watare" (Yukio Hashi)
- "Anogoro no Namida wa" (Yōko Nagayama)
- "Aoi Dōwa" (Chiaki)
- "Aotenjō no Crown" (Soul Flower Union)
- "Aozora" (Kayo Yoshimoto)
- "Aozora to Tap Dance" (Ikue Sakakibara)
- "Apple Purple Princess" (Mariya Takeuchi)
- "Apron Hero" (Hiroyuki Igarashi, Kiyoshi Ōzawa)
- "Arigato Thank You" (Ikue Kakeromanzu)
- "Arigatō" (Keiko Utsumi)
- "Arigatō Sayōnara" (Kiichi Nakai, Naoko Yoshida)
- "Arinko to Himawari" (Yōko Nagayama)
- "Aruite Mikka!" (George Tokoro)
- "Asa no Lift de" (Dark Ducks)
- "Asa Okitan" (Shōnen Shōjo Gasshōdan Mizuumi)
- "Ashita" (Chieko Baisho)
- "Ashita ha Genki: More Music!" (Miyoko Yoshimoto)
- "Assō ka!" (Kunihiko Tamai)
- "Attara Ii naa" (Half Moon)
- "Awate Tokoya" (Bonny Jacks)

=== B ===
- "Beautiful Name" (Godiego)
- "Boku wa Kuma" (Hikaru Utada)
- "Bye-Bye" (Ayumi Hamasaki)

=== C ===
- "Cabbage UFO" (Junko Kudō)
- "Candy no Yume" (Ami Ozaki)
- "Catch: Tsubi no Natsu ga Kuru yō ni" (135)
- "Chameleon" (Sugar)
- "Chanto Kao ni Kaitearu" (Iruka)
- "Chichinpuipui" (Miyuki Mori, Tokyo Hōsō Jidō Gasshōdan)
- "Chigueso Chikyu no Sora no Shitade" (Yoo Hae Joon)
- "Chikyū wa Genki" (Chikyū Genkimura no Nakamatachi)
- "Chikyū wa Minna no Dai Gasshō" (Suginami Junior Chorus)
- "Chimu Chimu Cherry" (Masanori Tomotake, Suginami Junior Chorus)
- "Chii-chan no Himitsu" (Ritsuko Ōwada)
- "Chiisai Aki Mitsuketa" (Bonny Jacks)
- "Chiisanakinomi" (Teruko Ōba)
- "Chiisana Tegami" (Yukio Hashi, Kazuo Funaki, Teruhiko Saigō)
- "Chitchana Photographer" (Hitomi Ishikawa)
- "Chotto Zutsu Aki" (Kuniko Yamada)
- "Christmas ga Sugite mo" (Christy & Clinton)
- "Chun Chun World ~Ogenki Taoisō~" (Ritsuko Ōwada, Hiromi Okazaki, Koji Imada, Koji Higashino, Yukio Iketani, Children's Chorus Genki-Gumi)
- "Chun Chun World ~Magic Carnival~" (Ritsuko Ōwada, Hiromi Okazaki, Children's Chorus Genki-Gumi)
- "Computer Obaa-chan" (Yūko Sakaitsukasa)

=== D ===
- "Daimyō Kyōretsu" (Seiji Tanaka)
- "Dakedo I Love You" (Oyunna)
- "Dare mo Shiranai"
- "Don Quixote" (Isao Sasaki)
- "Don Pepe no Uta" (Ado Mizumori, The Shadracks)

=== E ===
- "E-WaH-OH" (The Voice of Japan)
- "Egao" (Hiromi Iwasaki)
- "Egao ga Kaze ni Modoru Shunkan" (Yoshiaki Ōuchi & Taeko)
- "Egao ni Daisekkin" (Kyoto Performance Doll)
- "Eto wa Merry-go-round" (Seiji Tanaka, Tokyo Hōsō Jidō Gasshōdan)

=== F ===
- "Futari Bocchi Jikan" (Ringo Sheena)
- "Fight" (YUI)
- "Furusato" (Arashi)
- "Fūsen" (Mayumi Kojima)

=== G ===
- "Gakkō Sakamichi" (Muneyuki Satō)
- "Gamushāra" (Katsuya Kobayashi)
- "Ganbaranba" (Masashi Sada)
- "Ganbare My Boy" (Hiro Tsunoda)
- "Ganzō Banana no Tama" (Kōtarō Yamamoto, Tokyo Hōsō Jidō Gasshōdan)
- "Genki no Deru Uta" (Bonny Jacks)
- "Go Go! Kokekokkō" (Ryūsei Nakao)
- "Gōkaku Rock 'n' Roll" (Yukari Morikawa)
- "Gomennasai" (1970)
- "Gomen yo! Wan Wan" (Keita to Kōta)
- "Gorilla no Mentama" (Ryōko Sano)
- "Gottso-sama" (Tomō Sugai)
- "Grasshopper Monogatari" (Noppo Takami)

=== H ===
- "Ha-i! grasshopper" (Noppo Takami)
- "Hasta Luego: Sayonara Tsuki no Neko" (Naoko Ken)
- "Hakimono to Kasa no Monogatari"(履物と傘の物語) (AKB48)
- "Hato no Uta" (Da Capo)
- "Hikaru no Gen-chan" (Showta)
- "Hen na ABC" (Miyuki Ichijo, Tokyo Hōsō Jidō Gasshōdan)
- "Hige Hige Gehi Ponpon" (Tanqun Democracy)
- "Hoyahoyara" (Hajime Anzai and Friends)

=== I ===
- "I Love Tofu" (Shōji Koganezawa)
- "Ichiban Kirei na Hoshi" (Chiyoko Shimakura)
- "Ichiendama no Tabi Garasu" (Saori Hareyama)
- "Ichō Dance" (Mirei Kitahara)
- "Ii ne!!" (Takako Ōta, Yōsuke Sone, Yūko Miyakawa)
- "Ijiwaru Tenki" (BaBe)
- "Imademo Sencho to Yobareteiru Sencho no Yoru" (Yoichi Sugawara)
- "Inochi no Hanashi o Shiyō" (Judy Ongg)
- "Inori" (Kaori Futenma)
- "Irassyai" (Chieko Baisyo)
- "Iroha Matsuri" (Miyuki Mori, Hibari Jidō Gasshōdan)
- "Iruka La Bamba" (Naomi Matsui)
- "Ishin Denshin Shiyō" (Mitsue Ōshiro)
- "Itazurakko" (Ado Mizumori, Tokyo Jidō Gasshōdan)
- "Itsumo Egao de" (Shū Saeko)

=== J ===
- "Jabu Jabu Ondo" (Hibari Jidō Gasshōdan)
- "Jagaimo Jagā" (Seiji Tanaka, Tokyo Hōsō Jidō Gasshōdan)
- "Jōkyūsei" (Hiroko Moriguchi)
- "Joy: Yorokobi no Kuni" (Yū Hayami)
- "Jungle Dance" (Yōko Oginome)
- "Just Friends: Itsu Made mo" (Aya, Tokyo Hōsō Jidō Gasshōdan)

=== K ===
- "Kaa-san no Uta" (Peggy Hayama)
- "Kaa-san wa Yuki Onna" (Mitsuko Horie)
- "Kabocha no Oji-san" (Tessei Miyoshi, Tokyo Hōsō Jidō Gasshōdan)
- "Kagayaiteite: 10 Years After" (Asari Mizuki)
- "Kagayaki no Achira e" (Yōko Ishida)
- "Kaitō Yumenosuke" (Hiromi Okazaki)
- "Kakenukete Good-bye" (B'dash)
- "Kamekame Dance" (Yumi Matsuba)
- "Kanashiki Mongoose" (Seiji Tanaka)
- "Kani-san Kani-san" (Takuzō Kawatani)
- "Kankan Karasu" (Tokiko Katō)
- "Kanshajō" (Reiko Sada)
- "Kaori-chan Time" (Yumi Tanimura)
- "Kappa no Kui Kuo Kua" (Kappa no Qui Quo Qua)
- "Karucharatan no Sora" (Karyūdo)
- "Kasei no Circus-dan" (Yoshitaka Minami)
- "Katte Chō" (Tomoko Tane)
- "Kawa wa Dare no Mono?" (Tokyo Hōsō Jidō Gasshōdan)
- "Kawazura ga Kirakira" (Shōko Inoue, Tokyo Hōsō Jidō Gasshōdan)
- "Kazaguruma" (Miyuki Nagai)
- "Kazaguruma" (Sachiko Kobayashi)
- "Kaze ga Kureta Melody" (Richard Bona)
- "Kaze no Ban" (Yōichi Sugawara)
- "Kaze no Organ" (Junko Kudō)
- "Kaze no Tōri Michi" (Sayuri Horishita)
- "Kaze no Uta ha Kikoemasu ka" (Yumi Yoshikawa)
- "Kazeiro no Tonba" (Chie Hyo)
- "Ken-chan" (Youki Kudoh)
- "Kiiro no Jitensha" (Toshiharu Fujisawa)
- "Kimi ga Wasurete Ōki na Mono" (Angie)
- "Kimi ni Sachiare" (Reiko Sada)
- "Kimi no Iro Hoshi" (Hikaru Nishida)
- "Kimi no Te" (Mitsuko Horie)
- "Kimi wa Nagai ne" (Hiro Tsunoda)
- "Kin no Makiba" (Taeko Ōnuki)
- "Kinō Kyō Ashita" (Miyuki Kōsaka)
- "Kisetsu wa Sugite mo" (Chiemi)
- "Kitakaze Kazō no Kantarō" (Masaaki Sakai, Tokyo Hōsō Jidō Gasshōdan)
- "Kitchen Lady" (Ritsuko Ōwada)
- "Kite no Nai Okurimono" (Kazuo Zaitsu)
- "Kitto Shiawase" (Saeko Shū)
- "Kobutanoshippo" (Sugar)
- "Kodanuki Ponpo" (Atomu Shimojō)
- "Kodomo Dake no Natsu" (Yukihiro Takahashi)
- "Kohaku no Mahō" (Epo)
- "Koi Hanabi" (Mio Isayama)
- "Koi no Hana Saita" (Chizuru Kohigashi)
- "Koi Tsubomi" (Hanako Oku)
- "Koinu no Blue" (Rutsuko Honda)
- "Koisuru Niwatori" (Hiroko Taniyama)
- "Koi no Subesube Manjūgani" (Imakuni?)
- "Kōkō 3-nensei" (Naotarō Moriyama)
- "Koko de Mata Aō" (Yuka Kamebuchi & The Voices of Japan)
- "Kokoro ni Yume o" (Yōko Seri)
- "Kokoro no Umi" (Ajinai Hall)
- "Kokoro wa Hallelujah" (Kabocha Shōkai)
- "Kome no Uta" (Metrofarce)
- "Koneko no Byōki" (Vocce Angelica)
- "Koneko to Keito" (Tokyo Hōsō Jidō Gasshōdan)
- "Kono Ai o: Onee-san e" (Amin, Wei Wei Wuu)
- "Kono Hiroi Nohara Ippai" (Ryōko Moriyama)
- "Kono Mune Oide" (Atsushi Onita, Keiko Nakajima, Masayuki Tanaka)
- "Koro wa Yane no Ue" (Taeko Ōnuki)
- "Kotatsu Musume de Teketekete" (Naoko Nozawa)
- "Kuchibue Fuitara" (Miho Gomi, Tokyo Hōsō Jidō Gasshōdan)
- "Kuishinbō no Calendar" (Sumiko Yamagata, Suginami Junior Chorus)
- "Kuma no Nuigurumi" (Yūsuke Yoshioka, Tokyo Hōsō Jidō Gasshōdan)
- "Kumanbachiga Tonde Kita" (Akiko Yano, Miu Sakamoto)
- "Kumo" (Tarō Masuda)
- "Kumo ga Haretara" (Etsuko Sai)
- "Kuro" (Mimori Yusa)
- "Kyō mo Chappīendo" (Duke Aces)
- "Kyōfu no Hiruyasumi" (The Boom)
- "Kyōshitsu Ōwarai" (Miyuki Ichijō, Suginami Junior Chorus)

=== M ===
- "Makkuramori no Uta" (Taniyama Hiroko)
- "Message Song" (Pizzicato Five)
- "Metropolitan Museum" (Taeko Onuki)
- "Moonfesta" (Kalafina)
- "Mori no Chiisana Restaurant" (Aoi Teshima)
- "Mori no Kuma-san (The Other Day I Met a Bear)" (Dark Ducks)
- "Morning Musume no Hyokkori Hyōtanjima" (Morning Musume)
- "MOTTAINAI" (Lou Oshiba&Masahiro Niiyama)
- "Mushi'98" (GO!GO!7188)
- "Mushi no Tsubuyaki" (Yōko Oginome)
- "My Boy" (Roll Back)

=== N ===
- "Nekkokun" (Joji Yamamoto)
- "Nobiro Nobiro Daisukina Ki" (Ann Sally)
- "No ni Saku Hana no yō ni" (Gackt)
- "Negaigoto no Mochigusare" (AKB48)

=== O ===
- "Obaa-chan Moshikashite" (Emiko Shiratori)
- "Obaa-chan no Takaramono" (Yoshiko Kawase)
- "Obake to Issho" (Tokyo Performance Doll)
- "Oboeteimasu ka" (Kiyoshi Maekawa)
- "Oburadioburada" (Four Leaves)
- "Off Stage" (Akiko Kobayashi)
- "Ofuro no Uta" (Yūya Ioki)
- "Ofuroya-san e Tsuretette" (Yūta Hashizume, Tokyo Hōsō Jidō Gasshōdan)
- "Ogenki Mī-chan" (Satoko Shimonari)
- "Oh Makiba wa Midori" (Tokyo Shōnen Gasshōdan)
- "Oh My Wind: Sora wa Tomodachi" (Kiyoshi Sonehara)
- "Ohayō Crayon" (Hiroko Taniyama)
- "Ohirune no Yurikago" (Yōko Ishida)
- "Oira ni Horecha Kagesuruze!" (Kazuki Enari)
- "Ojii-chan no Blanco" (Eiko Hiramatsu)
- "Ojii-chan no Komoriuta" (Yūji Akimoto)
- "Ojii-chan-te Ii na" (Motoshi Shidō)
- "Ōki na Furudokei (My Grandfather's Clock)" (Sumito Tachikawa, Nagato Miho Kagekidan Jidō Gasshōbu)
- "Ōki na Ringo no Ki no Shita de" (Da Capo)
- "Ōki na Tsuki" (Kaori Morikawa)
- "Omoide" (Miyuki Mori)
- "Omoide Matsuri" (Miyuki Asō)
- "Omoide ni Tokenagara" (Hikaru Nishida)
- "Omoide no Album" (Dark Ducks)
- "Omoikkiri Yume" (Yū Mizushima, Katsushika AK Kinder Call)
- "Onaka no Ōki na Ōji-sama" (Kōichi Kawazu)
- "Onii-chan Zurui" (Nobunari Kitamoto)
- "Onii-chan ni Nacchatta" (Tomoe Wakamatsu)
- "Orangutan" (Yasunori Sōryō & Jim Rock Singers)
- "Orizuru" (Takako Yamamura)
- "Ōsaka Humanland: Yanka!" (Naniwa Gospellers)
- "Osampo" (Char)
- "Oshiri Kajiri Mushi" (Uruma Delvi)
- "Otanjōbi Omedetō" (Megumi Shiina)
- "Otō-san" (Asami Hayashi)
- "Otogi no Kuni no Birthday" (Noriko Sakai)
- "Otoshidama" (Hikari Ishida)
- "Otsukaresan" (Begin)

=== P ===
- "Papa to Rusuban" (Yumi Endo)
- "Popo Loouise" (Kuricorder Quartet and UA)

=== R ===
- "Raja Maharaja" (Jun Togawa)
- "Ringo no Uta" (Ringo Sheena)

=== S ===
- "Saboten ga Nikui" (Kuniko Yamada)
- "Saibō no Fushigi" (Testsu and Tomo)
- "Saigo no Shoot" (Sway)
- "Saka Agari no Yūyake" (Kuniyoshi Kiyosu)
- "Sakura, Mau" (Azumi Inoue)
- "Sakyū Neko" (Susumu Hirasawa)
- "Sanjō Osagarisetsu" (Azusa Katō)
- "Sansū Cha Cha Cha" (Peggy Hayama, Young 101)
- "Santa Maria" (Tsukasa Takei)
- "San'yūka" (Ranbō Minami, Yoshie Ichige)
- "Saraba Seishun" (Ken Tanaka)
- "Saramandara" (Isao Hidō)
- "Sarusa Iina Iine" (Hey! Say! 7)
- "Satōkibi Hatake" (Naomi Chiaki)
- "Sayōnara Concert" (Kazuo Zaitsu)
- "Seishun no Kao" (Ai Miyata)
- "Sekai ga Ichiban Shiawase na Hi" (Kusu Kusu)
- "Sekai o Musbō" (Sandora, Mori no Ki Gasshōdan)
- "Sekai wa Melody" (Shigeru Muroi)
- "Sen no Hana Sen no Sora" (Manami Kiyota)
- "Senaka de Twist" (George Tokoro)
- "Senro wa tsuzuku yo doko made mo (I've Been Working on the Railroad)"
- "Sense Honma ni Honma" (Osaka Sumiyoshi Shōnen Shōjo Gasshōdan)
- "Sensei wa Hashiru" (Masanori Tomotake, Tokyo Hōsō Jidō Gasshōdan)
- "Seru no Koi" (Akinori Nakagawa)
- "Shiawase Kyōryū Ondo" (Odoru 11)
- "Shiawase no Uta" (Ikue Sakakibara)
- "Shiawase no Yokan" (Naoyoshi Kamata, Yūko Yamaji)
- "Shijin to Tsubame" (Hitoshi Komura)
- "Shinpu-san no Pipe Organ" (Agnes Chan, Tokyo Hōsō Jidō Gasshōdan)
- "Shio no Nioi no Suru Machi de" (Suginami Junior Chorus)
- "Shiosai no Uta" (Bell & Accordions)
- "Shippo no Kimochi" (Hiroko Taniyama)
- "Shiranburi" (Tomoya Takayama)
- "Shiroi Michi" (Haifaisetto)
- "Shiroi Shōjo" (Yoshito Machida)
- "Shiroi Spitz" (Beagle Hat)
- "Shobokujira Chibi Cobra" (Tokyo Hōsō Jidō Gasshōdan)
- "Shooting Hero" (Duke Aces)
- "Shusse Ondo da yo!" (Saori Hareyama)
- "Smile" (Anna Banana)
- "Soba ni Ite yo Teddy bear" (Mio Watanabe)
- "Snowdrop" (Asuka Hayashi)
- "Soccer Boy" (Nao Nakadai)
- "Sōgen Jōka" (Chie Hyo)
- "Sokkuri Haha Musume" (Fusako Amachi)
- "Sokkuri House" (Hiroko Taniyama)
- "Sōmatō" (Hiromi Iwasaki)
- "Sonna Boku ga Suki" (Tama)
- "Sora e" (Tomotaka Okamoto)
- "Sora ga Boku no Otō-san" (Kazuo Zaitsu)
- "Sora no Chorus" (Meninas do Brasil)
- "Sora no Ocarina" (Junko Iwao)
- "Soratobu Kujira" (Yoshio Toyama, Dixie Saints)
- "Soratobu Penguin" (Katsumi Takita)
- "Soratobu Ringo" (Kazuo Zaitsu)
- "Sōshite Kimi wa" (Garo)
- "Sōshunbu" (Shōnan Chor Grün)
- "Sotsugyō Mae: 10-hi de 100 no Dekigoto" (Ayako Shimizu)
- "Sowa Sowa Calendar" (Hiromi Okazaki)
- "Sōyamisaki" (Da Capo)
- "Step by Step" (Toshinori Yonekura)
- "Sudatsuhi Made" (Yumiko Tanaka)
- "Susume! Hakkushon Baby" (Noriko Sakai)
- "Symphonic Variation" (The Kingtones)

=== T ===
- "Ta Chi Tsu Te To Te o" (Henry Band with M)
- "Tabi no Suki na Anata ni" (Minako Shioda)
- "Tabibito no yō ni" (Takao Horiuchi)
- "Tabidachi" (Yūzō Kayama)
- "Tabidachi no Uta" (Akiko Wada, Mori no Ki Gasshōdan)
- "Tadaima Shiawase" (Kiichi Nakai)
- "Taian Kichijitsu" (Cauliflower)
- "Taihen daa" (Tokyo Hōsō Jidō Gasshōdan)
- "Taiyō no Kodomotachi" (Lisa Ono, Noriko Matsuhara)
- "Taiyō no Toki" (Kaho Shimada)
- "Tanishi-chan" (Kensaku Morita)
- "Tanoshii Sansū" (Seiji Tanaka, Tokyo Hōsō Jidō Gasshōdan)
- "Terebi ga Kita Hi" (Pink Lady)
- "Time: Toki no Shiori" (Kengo Suzuki)
- "Toge Meku Spica" (Polkadot Stingray)
- "Torero Kamomiro" (Nishi Rokugo Shonen Shōjo Gasshodan)
- "Tsuki" (YOU&Mitsuru)
- "Tsuki no Hikari" (Yōko Seri, Tokyo Torubēru)
- "Tsuki no Fuusen" (Yoko Takahashi)
- "Tsuki no Waltz" (Mio Isayama)

=== U ===
- "Uchū Hikōshi no Uta" (Maaya Sakamoto)
- "Uchū no Uta" (Moro Fukuzawa)
- "Uchū wa Tanoshii Festival" (Cherish)
- "Uma Uma Ramen" (Rie Kameoka)
- "Umi e Kite" (Masako Mori)
- "Uja Kuju?" (Hikaru Nishida)
- "Uta wa Tomodachi" (Sapporo Kodomo Musical Group)

=== W ===
- "Wa ni natte Odoro" (AGHARTA)
- "Watage no Osanpo" (Inotomo)
- "Watashi to Kotori to Suzu to" (Tsutomu Aragaki)
- "Watashi no Subete" (Kyogo Kawaguchi)
- "Watashi wa Toufu desu" (Kazuo Kumakura, NHK Tokyo Children's Choir)

=== Y ===
- "Yamaguchi san chi no Tsutomu kun" (Ranbō Minami)
- "Yamiyami" (Etsuko Yakushimaru)
- "Yell" (Ikimono-gakari)
- "Yes, You" (Reiko Yamahata)
- "Yūkyū no Mori" (Kokia)

=== Z ===
- "Zō da Zō" (Isao Sasaki)
- "Zutto Tomodachi" (Keiko Utsumi)

== Animators ==
These animators have had their works appear on Minna no Uta.

- Creatures
- Seiji Fujishiru
- Osamu Fukushima
- Taku Furukawa
- Yoshiko Hada
- Yūji Hasegawa
- Seiichi Hayashi
- Kunpei Higashi
- Norio Hikone
- Yukio Honda
- Tadahiko Horiguchi
- Kazuhiro Hotchi
- Rumiko Hoya
- Umanosuke Iida
- Yuka Imabayashi
- Atsuko Ishizuka
- Azuru Isshiki
- Yūichi Itō
- Yoshirō Kajitani
- Takashi Kamata
- Akira Katō
- Yōko Kinoshita
- Keizō Kira
- Tameo Kohanawa
- Mayumi Kojima
- Katsuya Kondō
- Kazuaki Kozutsumi (Kozutsumi PON)
- Tatsuji Kurahashi
- Yōji Kuri
- Hiroshi Kuzuoga
- Akira Maeda
- Kazumi Matsumoto
- Tomomi Mochizuki
- Atsushi Mōri
- Masaaki Mori
- Yūji Moriyama
- Shinji Nagashima
- Shūichi Nakahara
- Kiyoshi Nakashima
- Takahito Nakazawa
- Kōji Nanke
- Hiroshi Nishimura
- Toshio Nishiuchi
- Hiroshi Ogawa
- Fumio Ōi
- Tadanari Okamoto
- Shingo Ozaki
- Osamu Sakai
- Seku Sakamoto
- Tsutomu Shibayama
- Makoto Shinkai
- Tadashi Sugawara
- Haruka Suzuki
- Natsuki Takaya
- Yoshiyuki Takeguchi
- Keiko Tanaka
- Naoya Tanaka
- Three-D
- Sadao Tsukioka
- Kimihiko Tsukuda
- Uruma Delvi
- Makoto Wada
- Jōji Wakai
- Takashi Yanase
- Kōtaku Yoshinaga
