= The Spizzwinks =

Yale University a cappella group

The Yale Spizzwinks
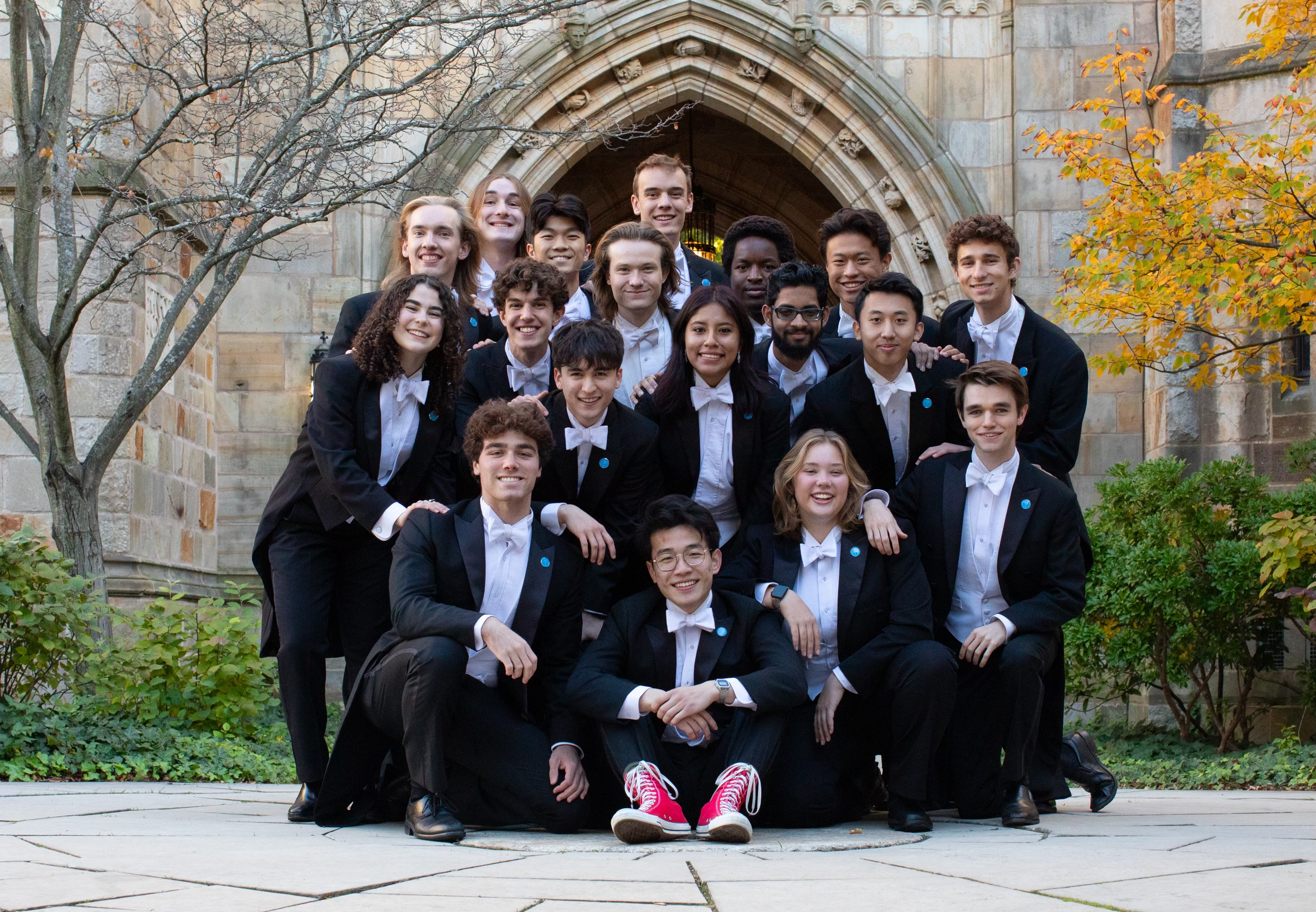

Background information
- Origin: New Haven, Connecticut
- Genre: A Cappella
- Years active: 1914, 1940–present
- Members: Tenor I; Clementine Kline '29; Harry Pambianchi '29; Nishka Chokhani '30; Sayuri Soto '30; Tenor II; Nate Stein '28; Jonny Duncan '29; Frogby Sachs '29; Gabe Ponichter '30; Baritone; William Wei '28; Ezra Zbar '28; Frank Petty '29; Jacob Tsang '30; Malcolm Hunter '30; Bass; Brennan Ujda '28; Josh Sugino '29; Steven He '30; Jack Friedman '30; Pitchpipe; Harry Pambianchi; Business Managers; Nate Stein; Brennan Ujda
- Website: www.spizzwinks.com

The Spizzwinks, stylized as The Spizzwinks(?), are an a cappella singing group of undergraduates from Yale University. Founded in late 1913, the Spizzwinks(?) are the oldest underclassman a cappella group in the United States, dating back to a first performance in early 1914.

Composed of roughly sixteen people, with exact numbers depending on the year, the Spizzwinks perform concerts and teach masterclasses through extensive international and domestic touring schedules. Through four principal tours each year, during Yale College's fall, winter, spring and summer recesses respectively, the Spizzwink Promise guarantees each member that they will tour on six continents and in their hometown during their three years in the group. The group is a 501(c)(3) non-profit organization.

== History ==
In 1913, four young men met at Mory's Temple Bar, Yale's historic tavern, to create a light-hearted alternative to the more serious Whiffenpoofs (composed solely of Yale College seniors). They decided upon the "Spizzwinks," a reference to a mythical creature to which the Corn Blight of 1906 had been whimsically attributed. Because the editor of the Yale Banner was unsure how to spell the fledgling group's name, he added a question mark in parentheses to the headline announcing its foundation. The group liked the look of "Spizzwinks(?)" and has officially adopted the symbol as both a part of its name and as a logo.

== Music and humor ==
The 'Winks repertoire comprises music arranged entirely by current and former members of the group, including a mixture of traditional Yale songs, songs by composers such as George Gershwin, Cole Porter, Leonard Bernstein, and more modern artists like Queen, MIKA, fun., The Beatles and Adele. The group values a signature "laugh of loud" humor, and a typical concert includes a variety of skits and other comedy.

Each year, the Spizzwinks(?) perform over 100 concerts across the nation and around the world, typically in jeans and t-shirts, Yale regalia or white tie. They have performed at the White House, Madison Square Garden, Carnegie Hall, US State Department, professional sporting events, as well as at country clubs, yacht clubs, churches, schools and resorts. The group sells CDs and other merchandise to raise funds for their touring, as they are completely self-funded.

== Notable alumni ==
Of all the underclassman a cappella groups which feed into the Whiffenpoofs, the 'Winks have sent more singers to the all-senior group than any other. This, along with their robust performance and touring schedule has given 'Winks a strong reputation at the college and beyond. Some notable alums include:

- Bobby Lopez '97, co-creator of the Broadway musicals Avenue Q and The Book of Mormon; composed songs for Frozen, including Academy Award-winning song "Let It Go;" winner of the 2004 Tony Award for Best Musical Score and the 2011 Tony Awards for Best Musical Score and Best Book of a Musical
- Jonathan Coulton '93, singer-songwriter, best known for composing the end themes to Portal and Portal 2
- Christophe Beck '91, Emmy Award-winning Hollywood film composer
- Steve Bodow '89, executive producer and former head writer for The Daily Show
- Joshua Malina '88, actor, best known for playing Will Bailey on Aaron Sorkin's The West Wing
- Noah Emmerich '87, actor, best known for roles in Miracle, The Truman Show and Super 8
- Charles Rivkin '84, former United States Ambassador to France
- Rick Westerfield '79, former Associate Conductor of the Boston Symphony Orchestra
- Rob Bell '72, founding member of Chanticleer
- Lewis Spratlan '62, Pulitzer Prize-winning composer
- George Roy Hill '43, director, Butch Cassidy and the Sundance Kid, The Sting, Slaughterhouse-Five and The World According to Garp; 1974 Academy Award winner as Best Director for The Sting
- John Hancock Daniels '43, former president and chief executive officer of Archer Daniels Midland

== Discography ==
The Spizzwinks(?) have published 36 full-length albums. Today, they publish an album every two years, giving every member the opportunity to sing on at least two professionally recorded albums with the group.

- Songs of the Spizzwinks (1948)
- Spizzwinks (1950)
- Songs of the Yale Spizzwinks (1956)
- Blue Skies (1957)
- New Horizons (1960)
- Yesterdays with the Spizzwinks (1961)
- The 50th Anniversary Album (1964)
- The Yale Spizzwinks(?) (1967)
- Hey Mister Ain'cha Got No Blue? (1969)
- Lip Service (1971)
- Imagination (1973)
- A Touch Of Class (1976)
- In Trouble (1979)
- Puttin' On The Ritz (1980)
- Steamheat (1982)
- No Regrets (1984)
- Nudge Nudge, Wink Wink (1989)
- The Hour Of Power (1991)
- One Coin, One Play (1993)
- Any Questions (1995)
- Eine Kleine Winkmusik (1997)
- Shine Your Shoes (1999)
- Four Score Seven (2001)
- Thank You, Come Again (2003)
- 90th Anniversary Collection (2004)
- Simply Put (2005)
- The Gloves Are Off (2007)
- Cause for Alarm (2009)
- The Myrrh the Merrier (2010)
- The Elephant in the Room (2011)
- Never Don't Go (2013)
- The Brothership (2015)
- Hometown (2017)
- Chasing Lights (2019)
- Mind the Gap (2022)
- En Route (2025)
