= Isayama =

Isayama (written: 諫山) is a Japanese surname. Notable people with the surname include:

- Hajime Isayama (諫山 創, born 1986), Japanese manga artist
- Mio Isayama (諫山 実生, born 1980), Japanese singer
