= Oshiri Kajiri Mushi =

Japanese children's song and anime series

Oshiri Kajiri Mushi (おしりかじり虫; lit. "Bottom Biting Bug") (Also known as Semut Penggigit Bujur in Indonesia) is a children's song in Japan that broke into the top 10 singles charts. The music video and song were created by the husband and wife duo Uruma Delvi.

== Overview ==
The song first appeared in 2007 on Minna no Uta, a Japanese TV program that targets children and is broadcast on Nippon Hōsō Kyōkai. "Oshiri Kajiri Mushi" means "[a] butt-biting bug" in Japanese, and the songwriters describe the protagonist as a magical bug that encourages people to interact with each other by biting their bottoms.

== Anime television series ==
- Oshiri Kajiri Mushi

おしりかじり虫
- Genre: Comedy
- Anime television series
- Directed by: Masayuki Kojima (season 1–2); Pon Kozutsumi (season 1); Kaori (season 2); Masatsugu Arakawa (season 3)
- Written by: Pierre Sugiura
- Music by: Kimitaka Matsumae
- Studio: Kinema Citrus
- Original network: NHK
- Original run: October 7, 2012 – December 7, 2015
- Episodes: 72

A children's anime television series, produced by Kinema Citrus, is broadcast on NHK and simulcast by Crunchyroll. The main role, 10 year old bug called Oshiri Kajiri Mushi XVIII, is voiced by Tomoko Kaneda.

Series	Station	First broadcast	Time
Series 1	NHK BS Premium	7 October 2012 - 24 February 2013	7:55 - 8:00
Series 1	NHK E-TV	7 April - 8 September 2013	7:20 - 7:25
Series 2	NHK BS Premium	30 September 2013 - 27 March 2014	18:25 - 18:30
Series 2	NHK E-TV	22 June 2014 -	7:20 - 7:25
Series 3	NHK BS Premium	6 October 2014 - 8 December 2014	18:25 - 18:30
Series 4	NHK E-TV	5 October 2015 - 7 December 2015	7:20 - 7:25
