= Mike Spoerndle =

American businessman (1951–2011)

- Born: December 16, 1951; Akron, Ohio, U.S.
- Died: May 6, 2011 (aged 59); East Haven, Connecticut, U.S.
- Occupation: Businessman

Michael E. Spoerndle (December 16, 1951 – May 6, 2011) was an American businessman based in New Haven, Connecticut. Known as "the man who made Connecticut rock," he was the founder and original owner of Toad's Place, a New Haven concert venue and nightclub, in 1976. It is still in operation today.

== Early life ==
Spoerndle was born in 1951 in Akron, Ohio, to Harry E. Spoerndle and Margaret Elizabeth Bragg. The family lived in Fairview Park.

After high school, Spoerndle graduated from The Culinary Institute of America.

== Career ==
In 1976, Spoerndle, who had recently moved to Connecticut, founded Toad's Place on York Street in downtown New Haven, converting the live-music venue from his French and Italian restaurant. The new name was derived from a childhood joke. He said: "When my parents were going out to dinner, they would tell me they were going to such-and-such, and I thought it would be funny if they said, 'We're going to Toad's Place.' Plus, people who didn't go out and stayed at home, we'd call them 'toads.' It was the equivalent of a couch potato."

Spoerndle worked with local musician Peter Menta and promoter Jim Koplik to bring in bands. Willie Dixon, Muddy Waters, John Lee Hooker and Koko Taylor were some of the first performers. In 1976, Brian Phelps joined as manager and eventually co-owner. Phelps took control in 1997.

Regarding Muddy Waters' appearance, Spoerndle overestimated the audience draw and had to pay part of the artist's fee with money from the register. He had to borrow $150 in order to be able to open the venue the following day.

In 1983, Spoerndle opened a second Toad's location, in Waterbury, Connecticut, but it closed after three years.

Spoerndle arranged a surprise performance of the Rolling Stones at Toad's Place on August 12, 1989, having promoted it as a private birthday party for Koplik. The following year, Bob Dylan played a six-hour set, his first club show in 25 years. Future artists included Billy Joel, Bruce Springsteen, R.E.M. and Bon Jovi.

According to Thom Duffy, editor at Billboard magazine: "[Spoerndle] built Toad's Place into one of the most important nightclubs in the nation. Not just for rock but every popular genre of music." Emilio Castillo, saxophone player for Tower of Power, said: "Mike is 100 percent honest, which is completely unheard of in a nightclub owner. The people that run the club have always bent over backwards to make you feel really good."

== Personal life ==
Spoerndle was married to Andrea Spoerndle but was divorced for years. Together they had four children together .

In 1993, he was awarded the Elm-Ivy Award, which was presented to people who worked to improve New Haven and Yale University.

Spoerndle sued Phelps in 1997 in the hopes of regaining ownership of Toad's, but was unsuccessful. In 2000, he told the Yale Daily Herald: "I lost my family, my business, everything that mattered to me."

In the last two decades of his life, Spoerndle developed a dependency on drugs and alcohol.

== Death ==
Spoerndle died in 2011, aged 59. The cause of death was unknown.
