= Jonkara Onnabushi =

2003 song and single by Yōko Nagayama

Jonkara Onnabushi (Note: Also spelt as Jonkara Onna Bushi or Jyongara Onna Bushi) (じょんから女節) is the name of both a song and single by Japanese enka singer Yōko Nagayama.

== Single ==
"Jonkara Onnabushi"

Single by Yōko Nagayama
- Language: Japanese
- A-side: "Jonkara Onnabushi"
- B-side: "Tamayura"
- Released: June 25, 2003
- Genre: Enka
- Length: 18 mins
- Label: Victor Entertainment
- Composer: Tsuyoshi Nishi
- Lyricist: Kiyo Suzuki

Yōko Nagayama singles chronology
"Rankyo (嵐峡)" (January 22, 2003)	"Jonkara Onnabushi" (2003)	"Arinko to Himawari (ありんことひまわり)" (June 25, 2003)

Jonkara Onna Bushi is a Japanese single by enka singer Yōko Nagayama released in 2003. The single features two songs; Jonkara Onnabushi, and Tamayura. It also includes a karaoke version of both.

== Song ==
"Jonkara Onnabushi"

Song by Yōko Nagayama
- Language: Japanese
- Released: June 25, 2003
- Genre: Enka
- Length: 4:41 mins
- Label: Victor Entertainment
- Composer: Tsuyoshi Nishi
- Lyricist: Kiyo Suzuki

Jonkara Onnabushi is the name sake for the single. It peaked at 21 on the Oricon Singles Chart. Yōko recalled that since elementary school, she has always invisioned a song about a wandering Tsugaru shamisen artist. This is featured in the music video in which a mother, who is a wandering Tsugaru shamisen artist, comes to conflict with her daughter. The songs instrumental features the shamisen, which Yōko has said is herself playing it.

On August 27, 2008, Yōko Nagayama released the single Boukyou hitori naki which features a new version of the song Jonkara Onnabushi titled "Jonkara Onnabushi (New Version)". She also released a karaoke version of the same song.

The song tells the story of a woman in love with a man she cannot have. Over the course of the songs verses, she grows from hurt, to passionate, as she deals with her conflicting emotions.

In the music video however, it focuses on a mother's conflicting relationship with her daughter.

== Reception ==
The song has been received generally well, receiving a height of 21 on the Oricon Singles Chart. Yōko has performed the song live many times, including three times on the Kōhaku Uta Gassen for the 54th, 55th, and 58th renditions of the show. While she did not perform it during the 56th rendition of the show, instead performing a song named "Bashōfu", Jonkara Onnabushi was ranked 60th on the survey conducted by the NHK for the 56th rendition of the show when selecting the shows participants.

During the 2025 Music Awards Japan, Yōko performed her song Jonkara Onnabushi during the conclusion of the Enka/Kayōkyoku section of the awards.

The song was also covered by a Korean singer during the 44th episode of the MBN Korea-Japan Top 10 Show.
