= Yōko Nagayama =

Japanese enka singer and actress

- 長山 洋子
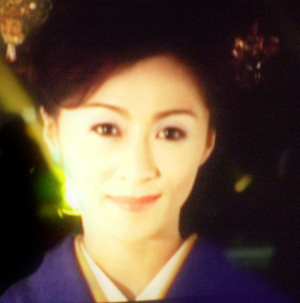
- Born: January 13, 1968 (age 58); Tokyo, Japan
- Occupations: actress; singer
- Spouse: Mark Smith (m. 2009)
- Children: 1
- Musical career
- Genres: Enka; J-pop
- Instrument: Vocals
- Website: www.jvcmusic.co.jp/yoko/

Yōko Nagayama (長山 洋子, Nagayama Yōko; born January 13, 1968) is a Japanese enka singer, former J-pop singer, and actress.

== Early life ==
Nagayama was born in Tokyo. At the age of four, she began attending min'yo group singing lessons with her father. Although she originally went because she enjoyed the attention from her father's classmates, she soon began studying and performing min'yo together with her father. When she was ten, she started playing shamisen. Her father gave her a shamisen that she still uses today.

She is married to American entrepreneur Mark Smith, president of IT staffing firm Skillhouse Staffing Solutions.

== J-pop era ==
Nagayama continued singing and performing through her junior high school years. Her plan was to become a professional enka singer after finishing junior high school. However, when she was sixteen, her handlers told her and her parents that she was too young to sing enka. Despite her father's wishes, she then decided to become a J-pop idol singer.

Her debut song was Haru wa SA-RA SA-RA (春はSA-RA SA-RA), released in 1984. It was not well received, nor were her releases over the next two years. However, in 1986, Nagayama had her first big hit with a cover version of British girl group Bananarama's dance-pop take on Shocking Blue's Venus. Her next song, "You're My Love," a cover of the Eurodisco hit by Patty Ryan, was also popular. Five of her songs (Venus, You're My Love, Kanashiki Koibitotachi, Heart ni Hi o Tsukete, and Hangyaku no Hero) were all Oricon top 10 hits.

During this time, Nagayama also performed in various dramas, such as the jidaigeki Sanbiki ga Kiru!, Minipato yori Ai o Komete, and Yūwaku.

== Enka era ==
In 1993, she started a second career as an enka singer. She received three prizes for her first enka song Higurashi (蜩). Suterarete (捨てられて) also became famous.

Nagayama continues to play the shamisen in many of her songs. Notable songs with shamisen parts are Jonkara Onnabushi (じょんから女節) and Usoda to Itte (噓だといって), the latter having been posted on YouTube under the title "DEATH BY SHAMISEN".

She regularly presents enka programmes on Japanese TV. Nagayama has had at least one song appear on the NHK program Minna no Uta. In 1993, she made her first appearance on the NHK New Year's Eve spectacular Kōhaku Uta Gassen. Since 1995, she has performed at "Kōhaku" for 13 consecutive years, making a total of 14 appearances to date.

On April 6, 2009 she announced on her blog that she had married American entrepreneur Mark Smith. They have one daughter, born in 2010.

Yōko was featured at the 2025 Music Awards Japan where she sang a few songs including: Tsugaru Kaikyō Fuyugeshiki, originally performed by Ishikawa Sayuri, which she sang as part of a performance detailing the seasons of Japan, and her own song Jonkara Onnabushi, which she sang at the end of the show.

== Discography ==
=== Jpop Singles ===
- Haru wa SA・RA・SA・RA (春はSA・RA・SA・RA) April 1, 1984
- Shabon (シャボン) August 1, 1984
- Hisoyaka ni Tokimeite... (密やかにときめいて…) February 21, 1985
- Shunkan 「Toki」wa Fantasy (瞬間「とき」はファンタジー) April 5, 1985
- Golden Wind (ゴールドウィンド) August 5, 1985
- Sugao no mama de (素顔のままで) December 5, 1985
- Kumo ni Noritai (雲にのりたい) May 1, 1986
- Venus (ヴィーナス) October 21, 1986
- You Are My Love (ユア・マイ・ラヴ) March 5, 1987
- Kanashiki Koibitotachi (悲しき恋人たち) June 3, 1987
- Heart ni hi wo Tsukete (ハートに火をつけて) October 9, 1987
- Hangyaku no Hero (反逆のヒーロー) January 12, 1988
- Lonely Goodnight (ロンリーグッドナイト) May 25, 1988
- KOIKO December 16, 1988
- Hitomi no naka no Faraway (瞳の中のファーラウェイ) February 21, 1989
- Katahaba no Mirai (肩幅の未来) July 5, 1989
- If We Hold On Together August 21, 1990

=== Enka Singles ===
- Higurashi (蜩) January 21, 1993
- Umi ni furu yuki (海に降る雪) June 2, 1993
- Namida Sake (なみだ酒) September 22, 1993
- Sougetsu (蒼月) March 9, 1994
- Meoto Sake (めおと酒) October 5, 1994
- Watashi ga Uarete Sodatta Tokoro (私が生まれて育ったところ) January 21, 1995
- Suterarete (捨てられて) March 24, 1995
- Kose ni shite ne (倖せにしてね) February 21, 1996
- Yokohama Silhouette (ヨコハマ・シルエット) June 21, 1996
- Tategami (たてがみ) November 7, 1996
- Tategami [Stage Version] (たてがみ「劇場版」) January 22, 1997
- O Edo no Iroonna (お江戸の色女) April 23, 1997
- Anoko ro no Namida ha (あの頃のなみだは) April 23, 1997
- Moonlight Jealousy (ムーンライトジェラシー) November 6, 1997
- Nani wa Yume Jouwa (浪花夢情話) November 6, 1997
- Koi no Platform (恋のプラットホーム) January 13, 1998
- Tōsan no Uta (父さんの詩) March 21, 1998
- Okeya no Hot Sun (桶屋の八つぁん) May 2, 1998
- Hanazono Shigure (花園しぐれ) November 13, 1998
- Kasa (傘) March 4, 1999
- Sadame Yuki (さだめ雪) August 4, 1999
- Musuba retai no (むすばれたいの) January 1, 2000
- Koi Sakaba (恋酒場) April 1, 2000
- Akai Yuki (紅い雪) November 1, 2000
- Touno Monogatari (遠野物語) May 17, 2001
- Meguri Ai (めぐり逢い) March 21, 2002
- Adesu gata onna hana Fubuki (艶姿女花吹雪) July 24, 2002
- Ai Arigato (愛ありがとう) November 23, 2002
- Rankyo (嵐峡) January 22, 2003
- Jonkara Onnabushi (じょんから女節) June 25, 2003
- Arinko to Himawari (ありんことひまわり) June 25, 2003
- Onna tankou bushi (おんな炭坑節) May 26, 2004
- Usoda to itte (嘘だといって) January 26, 2005
- Yoko no… Umi (洋子の…海) June 16, 2005
- Nagorino Tsuki (洋子の…名残月) October 19, 2005
- Kizuna (絆) April 26, 2006
- Matsue Funauta (松江舟唄) June 21, 2006
- Yoko no… Shinjuku Oiwake (洋子の…新宿追分) February 21, 2007
- Etsuraku no Sono (悦楽の園) August 22, 2007
- Boukyou hitori naki (望郷ひとり泣き) August 27, 2008
- Toi Machi (遠い街) January 21, 2009
- Seto no Banka (瀬戸の晩夏) June 10, 2009
- Okesa koi uta (おけさ恋唄) January 20, 2010
- Hakata Yamakasa Onnabushi (博多山笠女節) February 23 2011
- Kiso no Asunaro (木曽の翌檜) April 11, 2012
- Hottoshite Kudasai (ほっとしてください) October 31, 2012
- Moichido… Komori Uta (もう一度…子守唄) August 21, 2013
- Koi no Tsugaru Jusanko (恋の津軽十三湖) May 28, 2014
- Konpira Ichidan (金毘羅一段) April 8, 2015
- Fureaibashi (ふれ逢い橋) May 18, 2016
- Onna, Hitoritabi (おんな、ひとり旅) November 23, 2016
- Wakarejouzu (別れ上手) July 19, 2017
- Joppari Yosare / Koi - Shamisen (じょっぱり よされ / 恋・三味線) June 27, 2018
- Yozakura Blues (夜桜ブルース) September 26, 2019
- Anokoro mo Ima mo - Hana no 24 nengumi - (あの頃も 今も～花の24年組～) October 21, 2020
- Shitamachi Ginza (下町銀座) September 22, 2021
- Imasarane (今さらねぇ) September 2, 2022
- Oishii Osake Nomeryaii (美味しいお酒 飲めりゃいい) June 21, 2023
- Shirakami-Sanchi (白神山地) June 19, 2024
- Shōwa no Onna (昭和の女) June 25, 2025
- Ugo no Koiuta (羽後の恋唄) June 24, 2026

=== Albums ===
- Tokimeki...I Love You (ときめき…アイ・ラブ・ユー) March 21, 1985
- Venus (ヴィーナス) February 1, 1987
- Ondine (オンディーヌ) August 5, 1987
- The New Yoko Times (ニューヨーコ・タイムス) December 1, 1987
- Tokyo Menu (トーキョー・メニュー) March 9, 1988
- F-1 September 21, 1988
- CD FILE Yoko Nagayama VOL.1 (CD FILE 長山洋子 VOL.1) March 21, 1989
- CD FILE Yoko Nagayama VOL.2 (CD FILE 長山洋子 VOL.2) March 21, 1989
- Hitomi no naka no Faraway (瞳の中のファーラウェイ) June 7, 1989
- CD FILE Yoko Nagayama VOL.3 (CD FILE 長山洋子 VOL.3) June 25, 1990
- 25th ANNIVERSARY YOKO NAGAYAMA IDOL COMPLETE BOX〜LEGEND of VENUS〜 December 2, 2009
- Yoko Nagayama 40th anniversary Pops Best (長山洋子 40周年記念 ポップスベスト) February 21, 2024
- Yoko Nagayama 40th anniversary Enka Best (長山洋子 40周年記念 演歌ベスト) February 21, 2024

=== Covers ===
Yoko Nagayama has covered the following songs;

- Johnny Hates Jazz's song "I Don't Want to Be a Hero".
- Diana Ross's song: "If We Hold On Together" from the 1988 animated film, The Land Before Time.
- Madonna's song: "Papa Don't Preach".
- Shocking Blue's song: "Venus".
- Berlin's song: "Take My Breath Away"
