= Tsuki no Waltz =

2004 film by Atsuko Ishizuka

- Directed by: Atsuko Ishizuka
- Written by: Atsuko Ishizuka
- Music by: Vocals by Mio Isayama; Composition by Mio Isayama; Arrangement by Jun Abe; Lyrics by Reiko Yukawa
- Production company: Madhouse
- Release date: October 2004
- Running time: 4 minutes 40 seconds
- Country: Japan
- Language: Japanese
- Budget: Unknown

Tsuki no Waltz (月のワルツ; lit. Waltz of the Moon) is a 2004 Japanese anime music video created for the popular NHK program Minna no Uta by director Atsuko Ishizuka and Studio Madhouse.

== Production ==
Minna no Uta, a showcase for independent Japanese animators and musicians presented on the public broadcasting network NHK, had taken notice of Atsuko Ishizuka while she was still in college. Initially a student of graphic design, Ishizuka had taken to animation and produced several short films entirely on her own before being hired by Madhouse. It was shortly after being hired that Minna no Uta contacted her to direct a music video for their program. Convinced by the Minna no Uta staff, Madhouse promoted the low-ranking Ishizuka (then a production assistant) to director, and lent the studio's resources to the production.

After production was completed, the music video was shown on Minna no Uta broadcasts from the beginning of October through November 2004. Its success later prompted NHK to order another short from Ishizuka and Madhouse, Sen no Hana Sen no Sora, in 2005.

=== Animation style ===
The film is animated in Ishizuka's "moving sketch" style, giving the short the look of a hand drawn and colored pencil work. The animation and designs are not smooth or 'cleaned up,' giving them a rougher feel. This is a stylistic continuation of Ishizuka's earlier solo works CREMONA and Gravitation, the two works that had brought Ishizuka to Minna no Uta's attention, and has traditionally been a style more often seen in independent world animation rather than studio-produced anime. The animation itself was done by Madhouse veterans Yoshinori Kanemori and Yuzo Sato, with contributions from several other Madhouse staff. Despite the appearance, Tsuki no Waltz was done in much the same way as Madhouse's normal anime, using the technique of digital ink & paint for the coloring. Great care was taken to disguise and cover these modern production aids and ensure that the film looked as hand-crafted and individual to Ishizuka's style as possible. Ishizuka noted that her storyboards for the film elicited comparisons to Rintaro's Labyrinth Labyrinthos.

== Music ==
Cover of Mio Isayama's "Tsuki no Waltz" Single.

The song of the same name which the short was animated to was composed and sung by the young musical vocalist Mio Isayama. The song was later released as Isayama's 8th single on December 1, 2004. The lyrics were penned by Reiko Yukawa, long known in Japan as a prominent music critic, and the arrangements were by Jun Abe, known for composing the music of the popular anime Kodomo no Omocha and Fruits Basket.

== Reception ==
According to Benjamin Ettinger of AniPages Daily, Ishizuka received "literally thousands of posts on the BBS at her home page" after Tsuki no Waltz was aired. Ettinger himself called the film "probably among the best pieces made for the show Minna no Uta in the last few years." The film was also popular enough to receive a home video release.

== DVD release ==
As is the case for most of the Minna no Uta shorts, Tsuki no Waltz was not originally intended for home video release. Nevertheless, on March 30, 2005, its popularity among fans of the program warranted the short's inclusion on the Minna no Uta Best Hit Collection DVD (Catalog No.: TOBF-5372).
