= Aj lučka, lučka široká =

"Aj, lúčka, lúčka široká" (English: "Oh the wide, wide field") is a Czech folk song. A Slovak equivalent, "Horela lipka, horela" (English: "The lime tree burned, it burned") has the same melody.

The song has been used as a marching song, including by the Czechoslovak Army in the Russian Civil War. It notably achieved popularity in Japan under the name "Ō Makiba wa Midori" (English: "Oh, the pasture is green"). In 1961, it was the first national song broadcast by the Japanese music television show Minna no Uta. The song was brought to the United States by Czech immigrants, where Japanese pastor and church musician Nakata Ugo came across it and wrote Japanese lyrics.

"Aj, lúčka, lúčka široká" is the traditional opening song in Yale Whiffenpoofs concerts. In 2005, United States Secretary of Defense Donald Rumsfeld sang the song to Czech journalists on the steps of The Pentagon.
