= Los Angelenos =

- Cover to promotional single of live version released in Japan in 1981

Song by Billy Joel

from the album Streetlife Serenade
- Released: October 1974
- Recorded: 1974, North Hollywood, California
- Genre: Pop rock; blues rock
- Length: 3:41
- Label: Columbia
- Songwriter: Billy Joel
- Producer: Michael Stewart

"Los Angelenos" is a song written by Billy Joel that was first released on his 1974 album Streetlife Serenade. A live version was released on the 1981 album Songs in the Attic.

== Lyrics and music ==
The Long Island-raised Joel wrote the song while living in Los Angeles, California, reflecting his impressions of the city. Authors Don and Jeff Breithaupt suggest that the song reflects the "Left Coast displacement" he was feeling at the time. Joel biographer Hank Bordowitz similarly describes "Los Angelenos" as showing "that Billy was beginning to feel a bit homesick."

The lyrics to "Los Angelenos" celebrate the diversity of Los Angeles. They observe that the inhabitants of Los Angeles mostly have come from elsewhere, many far from California. They are searching for something that caused them to come to Los Angeles, but many get seduced by the nice weather and the availability of sex and drugs, and so remain even if they cannot find what they originally came for. Joel notes that these people are "goin' nowhere."

Author Ken Bielen describes the song as having a "funky rock beat." Joel biographer Fred Schruers describes it as having "hip-swinging rhythms." Music critic Mark Bego states that the song "rocks out" more intensely than any of Joel's work since he was with The Hassles in the 1960s. Bielen describes the melody as being similar to that of Bruce Springsteen's "Fire," which was written shortly after "Los Angelenos." Joel's electric piano is prominent in the mix.

== Critical reception ==
Allmusic critic Stephen Thomas Erlewine describes the "stomping 'Los Angelenos'" as one of the "few winners" from the Streetlife Serenade album. Schruers describes it as Joel's "best attempt to sketch a portrait of" Los Angeles. Bego states that song "essays [Joel's] life in the West Coast beautifully, with a critical eye." But Bordowitz says it has "a cynical quality." And Rolling Stone critic Stephen Holden states that it "presents a hackneyed picture postcard of L.A. as sexual wasteland." Rolling Stone Album Guide critic Paul Evans states that it is one of several "narrative vignettes" on Streetlife Serenade that "strain[s] to be clever." Billboard regarded it as one of the "best cuts" from Streetlife Serenade. In its review of Streetlife Serenade, Record World said that "the music aptly enhances the lyrical mood, most appropriately on the Spanish flavored 'Los Angelenos'".

== Live version ==
A live version of "Los Angelenos" recorded in July 1980 at Toad's Place in New Haven, Connecticut, was included on the 1981 live album Songs in the Attic. Erlewine states that the "fuller, better arrangement" makes the live version "hit harder" than the studio version. A 16 mm black-and-white promotional video was made of "Los Angelenos" being performed live at a small club in support of Songs in the Attic. A promotional single was released in Japan.
