= Whiffenpoof =

Tool for training scouts in tracking skills

A whiffenpoof is a tool for training Boy Scouts in tracking skills. It consists of a small log, about the size of a stick of firewood, with nails driven into it on all sides, so that it bristles with nails. This is dragged through the forest on a short leash by the older Scouts who are training the younger. It might thus create a track that the tenderfoot must learn to trace out. Or it might, alternately, be dragged across a trail in order to confuse the trackers. The fewer nails driven into it, the more difficult and subtle is the effect.

Thus it is that the word whiffenpoof can also refer to an imaginary or indefinite animal, e.g., "the great horned whiffenpoof". It originates from actor Joseph Cawthorn's ad-lib in a 1908 performance of the operetta Little Nemo. He was told to stall for time while something was corrected backstage. In the scene, his character described imaginary prey he had hunted, so he created the "water-dwelling, food-gobbling" whiffenpoof on the spot. Yale students in the audience appropriated it for the name of their singing society.

== Imaginary or indefinite animal ==
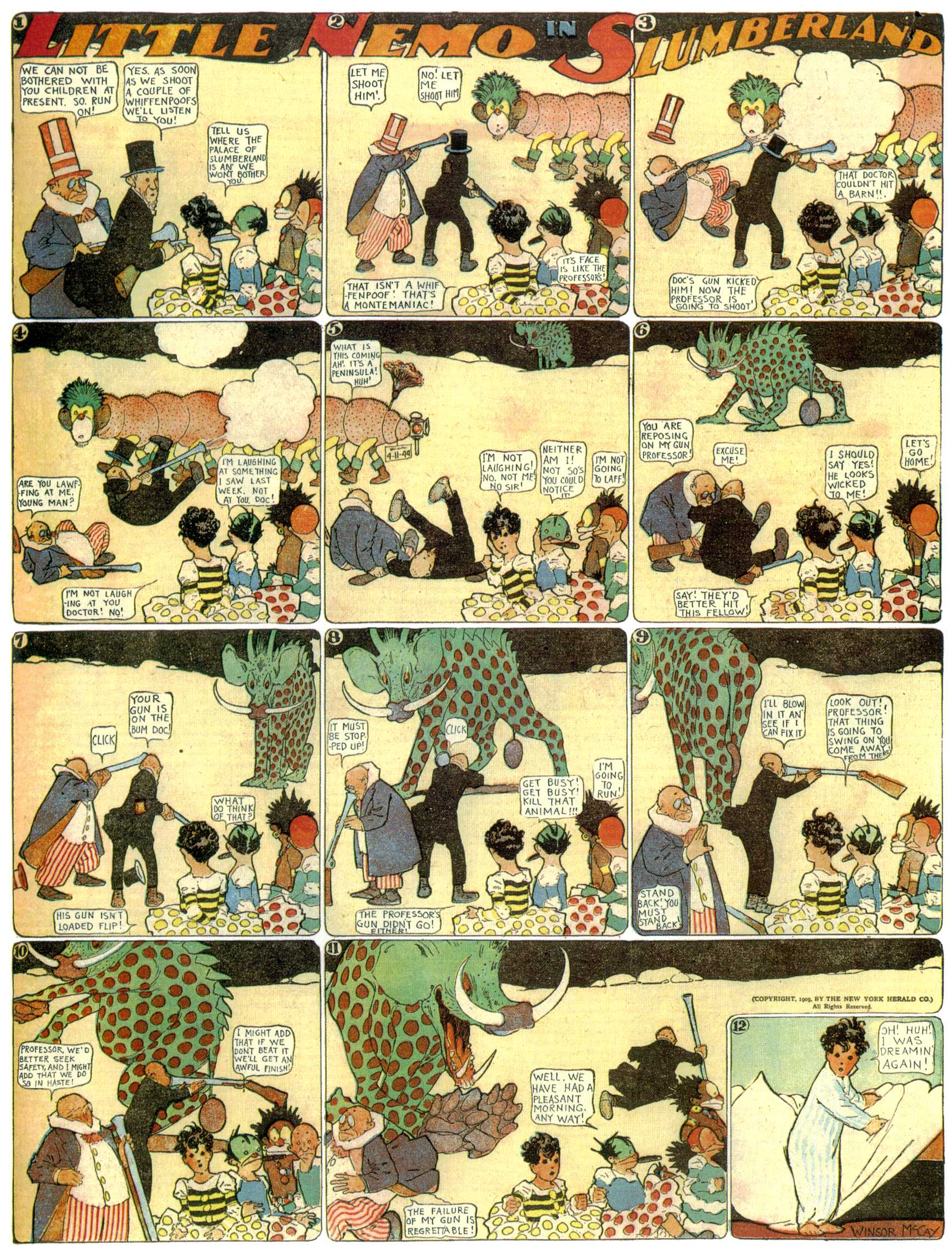
In the Little Nemo in Slumberland strip for September 26, 1909, the hunters look for whiffenpoofs but find instead a "montemaniac" and a "peninsula".

Particularly among hunters, "whiffenpoof" can be a tongue-in-cheek name for an imaginary animal like the jackalope, or a placeholder name for an animal (analogous to "thingamajig"):

"Therefore, I have scant patience with the type of argument in rebuttal — on either side — that says in effect: "You say the whiffenpoof is — or is not — protectively coloured. Now the other day I was out, and I saw — or did not see — a whiffenpoof, etc."

"... the ringtailed whiffenpoof and the four-wheeled skeezicks are languishing in confinement ...

"Still-hunting offers the purest forest experience. In a stand or blind, you can hear the cry of the whiffenpoof, the tap-tap-tap of the redheaded woodpecker, the scurry of the field mouse, and the sound of a hunting partner going grunt."

"Whiffenpoof" has been used as a joking fictitious name for a member of the upper crust; a 1922 Philadelphia newspaper columnist writes of an opera performance attended by "Mrs. T. Whiffenpoof Oscarbilt, Mr. and Mrs. Dudbadubb Dodo and [their] three dashing daughters who have just finished a term at Mrs. Pettiduck's School for Incorrigibles at Woodfern-by-the-Sea."

== See also ==
- Woofen-poof — a fictional bird
- Snipe hunt — a United States practical joke
