= Uruma Delvi =

Japanese pop music duo

UrumaDelvi (うるまでるび) are a Japanese husband and wife duo who recorded the song "Oshiri Kajiri Mushi", or "bottom-biting bug." The song was intended to encourage people who live in big cities to spontaneously interact with each other.

The video debuted in June 2007 on the children's music video program Minna no Uta. Videos typically remain in rotation for two months on Minna no Uta, but Oshiri Kajiri Mushi is the longest-running video on the program as it aired continuously for over five months. The song climbed up to number 8 from outside the top 100 on Oricon, the singles chart in Japan, and steadily climbed the charts to number 6 in the Fall of 2007. The cartoon bug featured in UrumaDelvi's music video stars in his own anime series.

In 2013, UrumaDelvi teamed up with Ryuichi Sakamoto of Yellow Magic Orchestra and David Byrne of Talking Heads to make a music video set to the song "Psychedelic Afternoon". The music video was part of a series of 3 videos produced by Zapuni in order to raise money for charities that helped children after the 2011 Japan earthquake.

In 1996, UrumaDelvi created some songs and artwork for the children's computer game SimTunes.
