= Chiemi =

- Gender: Female

Origin
- Origin: Japanese
- Meaning: Different meanings depending on the kanji used

Other names
- Variant form: Tiemi

Chiemi (written: 千恵美, 千恵巳, 知恵美, 智栄美 or チエミ in katakana) is a feminine Japanese given name. Notable people with the name include:

- Chiemi Blouson (ブルゾンちえみ; born 1990), Japanese comedian
- Chiemi Chiba (千葉 千恵巳; born 1975), Japanese voice actress, singer and model
- Chiemi Eri (江利 チエミ; 1937–1982), Japanese singer and actress
- Chiemi Hori (堀 智栄美 or 堀 ちえみ; born 1967), Japanese singer, actress, and entertainer
- Chiemi Ishimoto (石本 知恵美; born 1984), Japanese guitarist and vocalist, formerly of the Japanese rock band Mass of the Fermenting Dregs
- Chiemi Takahashi (高橋 千恵美; born 1976), Japanese long-distance runner
- Chiemi Tanaka ((田中 ちえ美; born 1994), Japanese voice actress and singer
