= Mio Isayama =

Japanese singer

Mio Isayama (諫山実生, Tokyo, 7 June 1980) is a Japanese singer.

== Biography ==
Mio Isayama debuted as a singer in 2002 under the EMI Music Japan label with the song for NHK's program Minna no Uta. Since then, she has had two other songs featured on the program, including her most popular hit, Tsuki no Waltz, which was described as "probably among the best pieces made for the show in the last few years."

== Discography ==
=== Albums ===
#	Title	Release date
1	Nadeshiko no Hana (撫子の華)	12 March 2003
2	Hana Kotoba ~Hana Kokoro Uta~ (ハナコトバ ～花心詩～)	10 September 2003
3	Haru no Kahori (春のかほり)	24 March 2004
4	Ren'ai Kumikyoku ~ One and Only Story (恋愛組曲)	26 January 2005
5	Woman	8 February 2006
6	Kokoro (こころ)	7 March 2007
7	Yumemi Gokochi (ユメミゴコチ)	12 December 2007
