= Mory's =

- U.S. National Register of Historic Places
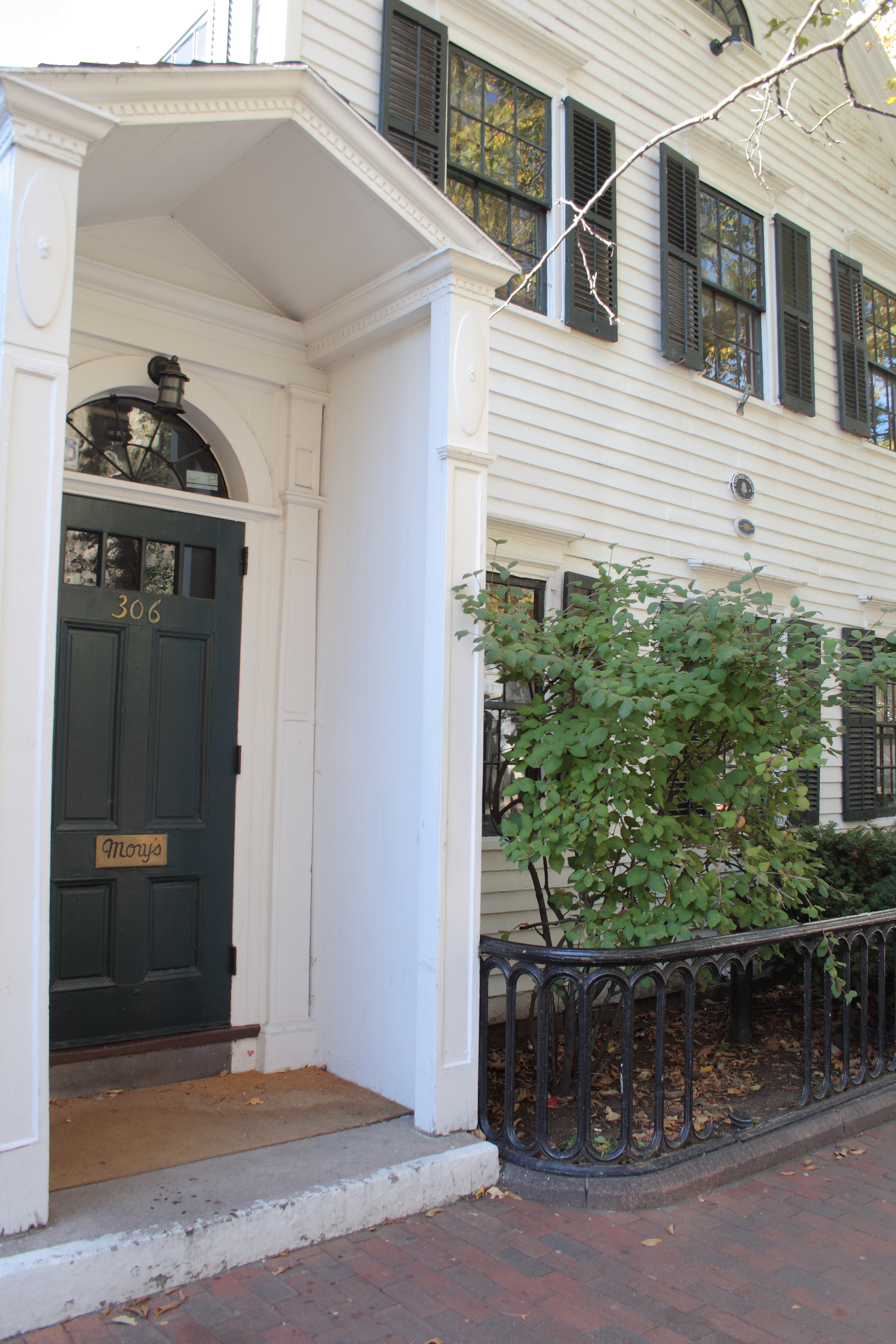
- Entrance to Mory's

- Location within Connecticut Location within the United States
- Location: 306 York Street, New Haven, Connecticut
- Coordinates: 41°18′41″N 72°55′54″W
- Area: 1 acre (0.40 ha)
- Architectural style: Federal
- NRHP reference No.: 04001552
- Added to NRHP: January 25, 2005

Mory's, known also as Mory's Temple Bar, is a private club adjacent to the campus of Yale University in New Haven, Connecticut, United States, founded in 1849 and housed in a clubhouse that was originally a private home built sometime before 1817. Originally it was a restaurant, especially hospitable to Yale undergraduates (it extended them credit), located at the corner of Temple and Center Streets, but in 1912, when the building was to be demolished, the owner and proprietor (since 1898), Louis Linder, sold it to a group of Yale alumni who moved the bar to 306 York Street and turned it into a membership club. The building was listed on the U.S. National Register of Historic Places in 2005.

After several years of operating losses and the 2008 financial crisis, the club closed indefinitely on December 19, 2008. Although the club had an endowment of $2 million, it was depleted by this poor performance and the market downturn in 2008–2009. After completion of a comprehensive business plan at the end of 2009 and progress on a fundraising effort, Mory's committed to a major renovation and a new business model in 2010. The fundraising effort and construction were completed in 2010 and Mory's reopened on August 25, 2010.

Membership in Mory's is now offered to all Yale students, employees, and alumni as well as members of the New Haven community with an affiliation to Yale. Membership was open to women in 1974 when the club was given the option by Governor Ella Grasso of remaining exclusively all male but without a liquor license. Yale undergraduates can join with a $15 membership fee that covers all four years at Yale. Alumni living within 30 miles of Mory's pay a $99 annual fee, while alumni living over 30 miles away pay a $49 annual fee.

== Traditions ==
Several important traditions are maintained at Mory's that have deep resonance with certain Yale alumni and students.

=== The Whiffenpoofs ===
The Whiffenpoofs, the a cappella group made up of Yale seniors who are recruited from other Yale undergraduate singing groups, sings weekly, usually on Monday evenings, in the dining areas of the club. They often perform the famous "Whiffenpoof Song" which mentions Mory's as the "place where Louis [pronounced as 'Louie' in the song] dwells." It was through this song, which was sung and recorded by Rudy Vallee, Bing Crosby and Elvis Presley, that the Club became part of the national consciousness in the early part of the twentieth century.

=== The Society of Orpheus and Bacchus ===
The Society of Orpheus and Bacchus, otherwise known as the SOBs, was founded at Mory's in 1938 and has remained in continuous existence since, making them the longest-running undergraduate a cappella group in the United States. They are the only undergraduate group, alongside the Whiffenpoofs, to perform at Mory's regularly with their weekly arrangement on Tuesdays.

The story, taken from their website: "On Halloween in 1938, twelve of the sweetest voices at Yale converged on Mory’s Temple Bar to form an a cappella group unlike any other. This group went without a name until they capitalized on a backhanded compliment received at a party— heard above the tinkle of ice was 'Those SOBs can sing!'"

=== The Spizzwinks(?) ===
In 1913, four young men met at Mory's to create a light-hearted alternative to the more serious Whiffenpoofs. They decided upon the "Spizzwinks(?)," a reference to a mythical creature to which the Corn Blight of 1906 had been whimsically attributed.

=== Cups ===
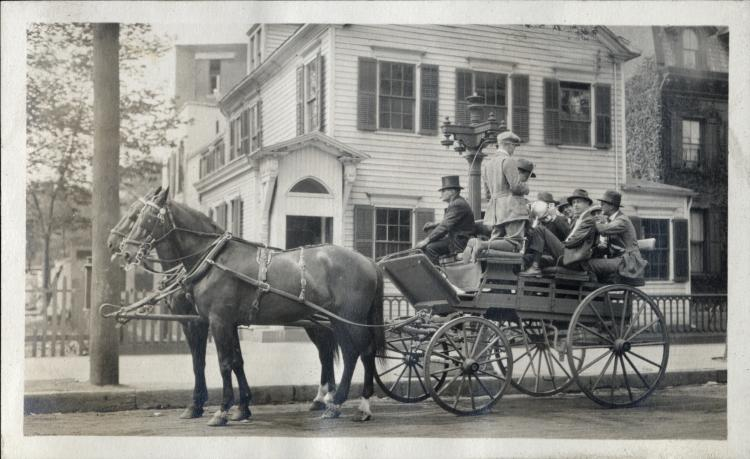
Mory's, circa 1914

Another tradition is the ritualistic consumption of a "Cup," in which a party of members gather to share drinks of assorted colors and ingredients (usually containing alcohol, although a non-alcoholic "Imperial Cup" is available) from large silver trophy cups that look like handled urns and are passed amongst the gathered company. The cups are ordered by color, and some are based on sparkling wines, while others are based on beer. There is an elaborate ritual, including at the completion of a cup a drinking song, associated with the tradition. Cups come in many colors including red, gold, purple, blue, green, and velvet.

When a member is about to finish a Cup, he or she faces the decades-old challenge of "cleaning the cup"—removing all moisture from the cup by using only his or her mouth and, to finish the job, hair. Friends to the left and right are at the ready with napkins to minimize drippage during this process. While the member is finishing, and to give that member extra time to "clean the cup," his or her friends are wont to chant the Mory's Song (an adaptation, for a diametrically opposite purpose, of the Salvation Army camp song "Put a Nickel on the Drum"), with the finishing member's name as the hero of the song:

It's [Name], it's [Name],
It's [Name] that makes the world go 'round,
It's [Na-ame], [Na-ame],
[Name] that makes the world go 'round,
It's [Name], it's [Name],
It's [Name] that makes the world go 'round,
It's [Name] that makes the world go 'round!

Sing Hallelujah! Sing Hallelujah!
Put a nickel on the drum;
Save another drunken bum!
Sing Hallelujah! Sing Hallelujah!
Put a nickel on the drum and you'll be saved.

I'm H-A-P-P-Y to be F-R-double-E,
F-R-double-E to be S-A-V-E-D,
S-A-V-E-D from the bonds of S-I-N;
Glory, glory, Hallelujah; hip-hooray, amen!

Sing Hallelujah! Sing Hallelujah!
Put a nickel on the drum;
Save another drunken bum!
Sing Hallelujah! Sing Hallelujah!
Put a nickel on the drum and you'll be saved!

I was lying in the gutter,
I was covered up in beer, (BEER!)
Pretzels in my moustache [or "eyebrows"],
I thought the end was near, (BEER!)
Then along came [Name]
And saved me from my curse [or "the hearse"]!
Glory, glory, Hallelujah; sing another verse!

Sing Hallelujah! Sing Hallelujah!
Put a nickel on the drum;
Save another drunken bum!
Sing Hallelujah! Sing Hallelujah!
Put a nickel on the drum and you'll be saved!

At the conclusion of the Mory's Song, the member places the trophy cup, upside down, on top of a cloth (or, for greater challenge due to the latter's higher absorbency, a paper) napkin, whereupon three friends place their respective hands atop the base of the cup and tap firmly. The cup is then whisked away, and the napkin is inspected for any signs of moisture. In decades past, and to date for some more conservative organizations, if the napkin were wet, then the finishing member would be forced to pay for the cup; if the napkin were dry, the member to the finishing member's left—who himself chose to forgo finishing the cup—would have to pay. (Organizations still following these rules often vary them as to the specifics: Some organizations requiring that the cost of the cup be divided among the two or three previous drinkers rather than only the immediately previous one. Some organizations exempt women preceding the "draining" drinker from having to pay, instead assessing only the man or men to that drinker's left for the cup's cost, on the grounds that a woman should not be expected to drain the cup and therefore did not forgo a clear opportunity to do so.) In more modern times, most toasting parties split the bill evenly amongst members, regardless of who fails to drain or declines the opportunity to drain a cup.

=== Table carving ===
Another tradition was the encouraged practice of carving the tops of the dining tables at which one sat. The carving might be simply initials or names, or, in the case of the Whiffs' table, a Pendragon rampant.

=== Yale Political Union ===
Since the early-to-middle 20th century, some of the parties of the Yale Political Union (particularly those on the right) have adjourned to Mory's, "as is traditional." While the parties no longer actually go to Mory's after debates as party debates have gotten longer and Mory's hours shorter over the years, the tradition of saying that a debate caucus adjourns to Mory's remains. The parties of the Union have, over time, picked up the tradition of dining at Mory's, though, particularly for weekly Friday lunches, and most hold toasting sessions there as often as two or three times each semester. Current and past club members include John Kerry, Bill Clinton, George H. W. Bush, Gerald Ford, John R. Bolton, George Pataki, Joe Lieberman, John Heinz, Paul Mellon, William Howard Taft, and William F. Buckley, Jr.

=== Special menu items ===
There are two special menu items that bring the denizens of Mory's back to the carved wooden tables and the walls covered with trophies of the past. They are Baker Soup, a potage heavy on tomato, curry, and cream and topped with croutons; and The Rabbit, a version of Welsh rabbit.

== See also ==
- National Register of Historic Places listings in New Haven, Connecticut

== Additional sources ==
- Norris G. Osborn, The Moriartys of Yale, New Haven, Yale, 1912.
- George D. Vaill, Mory's: A Brief History, New Haven, 1977.
