= Satoko Shimonari =

Japanese singer and actress

Satoko Shimonari 下成 佐登子
- Born: 26 August 1961 (age 64); Miyazaki, Japan
- Genres: Japanese pop
- Occupation(s): Singer occasional actress
- Instrument: Vocals
- Years active: 1978–present
- Website: ameblo.jp/sksatoko/

Satoko Shimonari (下成 佐登子, Shimonari Satoko) is a Japanese singer and occasional actress. She married Seiji Kameda, a musician.
