= Eoörnis pterovelox gobiensis =

Scientific hoax bird

"Eoörnis resting on a rocky pinnacle, supported by the rapid vibration of the wings"

Eoörnis pterovelox gobiensis is a fictional bird, a humorous hoax by Lester W. Sharp, professor of botany, Cornell University, United States.

It was initially a short talk presented together with a graduate student, Cuthbert Fraser, about the most unusual bird from the Gobi Desert, called woofen-poof by the local populace. Eventually it grew into a 34-page monograph signed by an "Augustus C. Fotheringham, Sc.D. (Cantab.), F.R.G.S.", printed by "The Buighleigh Press" in 1928, full of illustrated detail of anatomy, physiology, ecology, evolution, and historical references, complete with Cro-Magnon cave paintings — all inspired by a car mascot of a pelican. For example, Pterovelox "is perhaps most frequently observed in a peculiar resting position — legs straight out behind with the feet on the rock, tree branch or other object, the body being supported by continuous vibration of wings".

The monograph has later been reprinted several times.

The peculiarities of the bird's mating were even unwittingly quoted in a eugenics article on consanguineous marriages in 1934: "A new, and recently authenticated, case of naturally determined incest, appears to have been discovered by the British Museum Expedition to the Gobi Desert in 1929, when a bird, the Eoörnis pterovelox gobiensis, was found, which hatches twins at each birth, a male and a female, and these same individuals later mate and are monogamous."

Harriet Creighton recalls her witnessing how the woofen-poof hoax backfired on the hoaxer himself. In her presence, Professor Sharp was reading with disbelief a review on "Eoörnis..." published in The Quarterly Review of Biology (Pearl 1930, reprinted in 1976) and was truly under the impression that the reviewer was hoaxed until he reached the end, which made clear that the review was on par with the reviewed article.

The Journal of Paleontology published another review, by Frank C. Whitmore. of the U.S. Geological Survey in 1967 (41: 1302-1303), which was singled out in a tribute to Dr. Whitmore as "an example of the good doctor's breadth of knowledge, attention to detail, and mellow humor".

The back cover of the 2007/2011 Euston Grove Press print of the monograph says it was a mockery of heavily promoted Central Asiatic Expeditions of Roy Chapman Andrews and the American Museum of Natural History.
