= The Whiffenpoofs =

Yale University a cappella group

The Yale Whiffenpoofs

Background information
- Genre: A cappella
- Years active: 1909–present
- Website: whiffenpoofs.com

Bright College Years
A recording of the 2006 Whiffenpoofs singing Yale's unofficial alma mater

The Yale Whiffenpoofs is a collegiate a cappella singing group at Yale University. Established in 1909, it is the oldest such group in the United States. Best known for "The Whiffenpoof Song", the group is composed of 14 senior students who compete for admission in the spring of their junior year. Former members include Cole Porter, Jonathan Coulton, and Yale professor Joel Baden.

== Name ==
According to Whiffenpoof historian James M. Howard:

It was Goat Fowler who suggested we call ourselves The Whiffenpoofs. He had been tickled by the patter of one of the characters in a Victor Herbert musical comedy called "Little Nemo" which recently been running on Broadway. In a scene in which there was great boasting of terrific exploits in big game hunting and fishing, comedian Joseph Cawthorn told a fantastic tale of how he had caught a Whiffenpoof fish. It seems that Cawthorn had coined the word some years before when he and a fellow actor were amusing themselves by making up nonsense verses. One they particularly liked began: "A drivaling grilyal yandled its flail, One day by a Whiffenpoof's grave." Cawthorn recalled the verse in making up his patter for "Little Nemo" and put it into his act. Whether the word meant fish, flesh or fowl was irrelevant to our purpose when we chose it as our name. "Whiffenpoof" fitted in with our mood of free and exuberant fancy and it was adopted with enthusiasm.

Other sources also describe this name origin, at least one also referring to Howard.

== History and activities ==
The Whiffenpoofs' best-known alumnus may be Cole Porter, who sang in the 1913 line-up; the group often performs Porter songs in tribute.

The Whiffenpoofs have performed for generations at a number of venues, including Lincoln Center, the White House, the Salt Lake Tabernacle, Oakland Coliseum, Carnegie Hall and the Rose Bowl. The group has appeared on such television shows as Jeopardy!, The Today Show, Saturday Night Live, 60 Minutes, Gilmore Girls, The West Wing, and Glee. In December 2010, the group appeared on NBC's a cappella competition The Sing-Off; they were eliminated fourth, on the second show.

During the school year, the Whiffenpoofs perform on Monday nights at Mory's, known more formally as Mory's Temple Bar, circulating from room to room.

The Whiffenpoofs travel extensively during the school year and take a three-month world tour during the summer. The group's business manager and musical director, known in Whiffenpoof tradition respectively as the "Popocatépetl" and "Pitch pipe", are chosen by members of the previous year's group. An alumni organization maintains close ties with the group.

"Aj lučka, lučka široká", a Czech folk song, is the traditional opening number in Whiffenpoofs concerts.

=== Female membership ===
Women matriculated at Yale beginning in 1969, and votes on the subject of admitting women to the Whiffenpoofs took place starting in the 1970s. Each vote denied female singers the opportunity to join the group. Women were allowed "show" auditions but were never "tapped" (chosen) for the group. As recently as November 20, 2016, the group voted against admitting women. A record number of women turned out for the 2017 auditions.

In early February 2018, the Whiffenpoofs announced (in a joint statement with their sister group Whim 'n Rhythm) that students of both genders would be eligible to audition. Later that month, the group accepted its first female member, Sofía Campoamor. The following year, the group accepted its second female member and first woman of color, Neha Bhatt. In February 2021, the Whiffenpoofs appointed their first non-male business manager, Sydney Bakal, and in February 2025, their first non-male music director, Eunice Oh.

== "The Whiffenpoof Song" ==
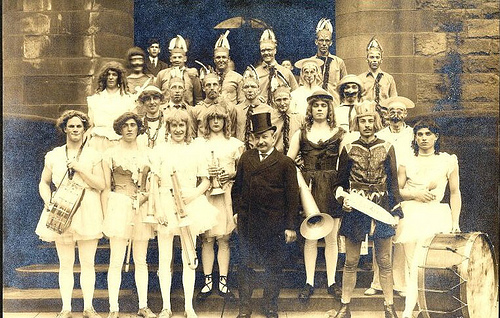
Whiffenpoofs of 1912 (dressed in tutus) posing with Louie Linder (in tophat), 1912

"The Whiffenpoof Song", the group's traditional closing number, is a four part male-voice choral song (TTBar.B) and was published in sheet music form in 1909. For the lyrics, Yale students Meade Minnigerode and George S. Pomeroy adapted Rudyard Kipling's poem "Gentlemen-Rankers". The poem had already been set to music by Tod B. Galloway (1863–1935; Amherst, 1885) and the sheet music copyrighted in 1909 and 1918 and again in 1936.

In the lyrics, "Mory's" refers to Mory's Temple Bar, a restaurant next to the campus and especially hospitable to Yale undergraduates (it allowed them credit), and "Louie" to its owner (1898–1912), Louis Linder. "Shall I Wasting" is shorthand for "Shall I Wasting in Despair", and "Mavourneen" stands for "Kathleen Mavourneen", both popular part-songs in the Victorian era.

=== In popular culture ===
The song has been recorded many times. It became a hit for Rudy Vallée in 1937 and in 1947 for Bing Crosby, credited to Bing Crosby with Fred Waring and The Glee Club (Decca 73940). It has also been recorded by Elvis Presley, Count Basie, Perry Como, Robert Merrill, Ray Conniff, Mitch Miller, the Ames Brothers, The Statler Brothers, the Sons of the Pioneers, Louis Armstrong, and countless others.

The chorus, as sung by flyers and crews of the U.S. Army Air Forces' daylight bombing effort during World War II, played a key role in the 1949 movie Twelve O'Clock High. It is heard first in the background when Harvey Stovall (Dean Jagger) surveys the abandoned Archbury airfield in 1949, just before his flashback to 1942 begins. The men sing it quietly in the Officer's Club after the unit receives its first commendation, baffling Stovall and General Savage (Gregory Peck) with their subdued reaction: "They aren't celebrating the way kids ought to ..." At the end of the film, when Stovall returns to the present, the refrain of "Don't Sit Under the Apple Tree" shifts with a flourish of trumpets to the remembered voices singing "We're poor little lambs ..." which becomes a triumphant instrumental phrase and fanfare over "The End".

In the 1952 comedy film Monkey Business, the tune comes on the radio and Cary Grant starts singing it to Marilyn Monroe, who declares it "a silly song". Later, Ginger Rogers sings it to Grant and describes it as "our song". And later still, Grant sings it to Rogers when he is locked out of the hotel room.

In the 1952 film Road to Bali from Paramount Pictures, starring Bob Hope, Bing Crosby, and Dorothy Lamour, Hope and Crosby find themselves in front of a herd of sheep. They sing the first part of the song's chorus with the special effect sheep "choir" adding the ending "Baa!, Baa!, Baa!" Crosby remarks, "That was helpful, wasn't it?" and Hope retorts, "Fred Waring must have played through here", referring to Bing's hit single of the tune, which was backed by Waring and his Glee Club.

The song is referenced in Donna Tartt's 1992 novel The Secret History.

The melody is the opening theme of the 1975 television series Baa Baa Black Sheep, a fictionalization of the World War II wartime exploits of the United States Marine Corps Marine Fighter Squadron VMF-214, predecessor of the Corps' present-day VMFA-214 "Black Sheep" Squadron. "The Whiffenpoof Song" has long been associated with VMA-214. One of the squadron's members, Paul "Moon" Mullen, adapted "The Whiffenpoof Song" for the squadron's use. The squadron's badge features a gamboling black lamb that refers back to the song.

In the fourth season of The West Wing, the Whiffenpoofs were featured in the eleventh episode, "Holy Night", staying at the White House after a winter storm left them stranded after a Christmas Eve performance. Throughout the episode they performed Bye Bye Blackbird and The Girl from Ipanema, then singing O Holy Night in the episodes' final scene.

The Whiffenpoofs can be heard singing in the background in the 2006 movie The Good Shepherd, in the scene where Matt Damon's character can be seen looking at the pictures in the Skull and Bones tomb after his recruitment and when his son tells him he wants to join the CIA.

In the play Serenading Louie by Lanford Wilson, performed at the Donmar Warehouse in London in 2010, the song is sung by the cast and by Bing Crosby.

During the song "Together Again" in the musical version of Young Frankenstein, Frederick Frankenstein confesses to Igor that he "was in fact the Whiffenpoof at Yale", which impresses Igor.

In The Simpsons episode "The Caper Chase", the Whiffenpoofs perform the song to Montgomery Burns, who offers the college a new library if it will have them killed.

== Emblem ==
The group adopted the Whiffenpoof emblem in 1912. Depicting a heraldic wyvern with mint leaves for wings, a horse's neck, and a swizzle stick for a perch, it was designed by a cartoonist from campus humor magazine The Yale Record.

== Notable members ==
- Christophe Beck, television and film composer
- Henry Becton, chairman of Becton, Dickinson and Company
- Prescott Bush, U.S. Senator, father of President George H. W. Bush and grandfather of President George W. Bush
- Jonathan Coulton, singer-songwriter
- C. William Harwood, conductor
- Emil Henry, CEO Henry Tiger LLC, U.S. Assistant Secretary of the Treasury
- Charles Kullman, operatic tenor
- Ron Livingston, actor
- Peter Peltz, artist
- Cole Porter, composer, songwriter
- Charles Rivkin, U.S. Assistant Secretary of State for Economic and Business Affairs
- Josh Singer, Oscar-winning screenwriter
- John Stewart, operatic tenor

== See also ==
- The Whiffenpoof Song at Wikisource
