= Akiko Shikata discography =

- Studio albums: 11
- Soundtrack albums: 2
- Compilation albums: 2
- Singles: 3
- B-sides: 3

The discography of Akiko Shikata, a Japanese singer-songwriter and game music composer, consists of a variety of releases. She has released five original vocal albums, three under major labels, and myriad soundtrack releases.

== Albums ==
=== Studio albums ===
Year	Album information	Chart positions	Total sales
2001	Midori no Mori de Nemuru Tori (緑の森で眠ル鳥, A Bird Sleeping in the Green Forest): Independently released EP; Released: November 28, 2001; Label: Vagrancy (AURA-0001); Formats: CD	–	–
2003	Haikyo to Rakuen (廃墟と楽園, Ruins and Paradise): Independent release; Released: August 24, 2003; Label: Vagrancy (AURA-0003); Formats: CD	–	–
2005	Navigatoria: Released: July 20, 2005; Label: Hats Unlimited (HUCD-10011); Formats: CD, digital download	151	2,593
2006	Raka: Released: October 25, 2006; Label: Hats Unlimited (HUCD-10024); Formats: CD, digital download	34	8,458
2009	Harmonia: Released: March 18, 2009; Label: Avex Trax (AVCD-23769); Formats: CD	15	17,018
2013	Turaida: Released: October 23, 2013; Label: Frontier Works (FCCV-0034); Formats: CD	–	–

=== Compilation albums ===
Year	Album information	Chart positions	Total sales
2007	Istoria: Musa: Independent release; Collaboration album with a myriad of other video game music composers.; Released: December 29, 2007; Label: Vagrancy (AURA-0013); Formats: CD	–	–
2008	Kara*Cola: Hymmnos Orgel Collection: Independent release; Collection of music box remixes for songs of the Ar tonelico games; Released: August 17, 2008; Label: Vagrancy (AURA-0014); Formats: CD	270	593

=== Soundtrack albums ===
Year	Album information	Chart positions	Total sales
2003	Hanakisō Soundtracks (花帰葬 SOUNDTRACKS): Independently released; Game Hanakisō soundtrack; Released: December 28, 2003; Re-released 2004/2006.; Label: Vagrancy (AURA-0005~6); Formats: CD	–	–
2008	Umineko no Naku Koro ni (うみねこのなく頃に, When the Seagulls Cry): Game Umineko no Naku Koro ni opening theme single EP.; Released: August 29, 2008; Label: Frontier Works (KNIL-0003); Formats: CD	21	11,518
2010	Utau Oka: Ar=ciel Ar=dor: Image songs that tell myths from the world of the Ar tonelico games, Ar Ciel. Includes a remix of the opening song from the third game.; Released: September 29, 2010; Label: Frontier Works (FCCM-328); Formats: CD	12	12,000
2011	Byakumu no Mayu ~Ricordando il passato~: Concept CD with "Forest" as the main theme. It features Umineko no Naku Koro ni Chiru EP8's ending theme.; Released: June 8, 2011; Label: Frontier Works (FFCT-0009); Formats: CD	–	–

=== Instrumental albums ===
All instrumental albums have been independently released and did not chart on Oricon albums charts.

Year	Album information
2002	Petit Fours: Performed on music box; Released: March 17, 2002; Label: Vagrancy (AURA-0002); Formats: CD
2003	Horizon Blue: Performed on music box; Released: March 30, 2003; Label: Vagrancy; Formats: CD
2003	Kurenawi (くれなゐ, Crimson): Performed on music box; Released: May 4, 2003; Label: Vagrancy; Formats: CD
2004	Viridian: Performed on music box; Released: January 11, 2004; Label: Vagrancy (AURA-0004); Formats: CD
2005	Wisteria: Performed on music box; Released: December 30, 2005; Label: Vagrancy (AURA-0007); Formats: CD
2007	Kalliope: Piano Concert: Piano remixes of previously released songs.; Released: January 7, 2007; Label: Vagrancy (AURA-0012); Formats: CD
2009	Fluff: Orgel Arrange Mini Album (EP): Performed on music box; Released: December 30, 2009; Label: Vagrancy (AURA-0015); Formats: CD
2013	Hagurumakan no Elde: Performed on music box, Concept Album; Released: August 12, 2013; Label: Vagrancy (AURA-0021); Formats: CD

== Singles ==
Year	Single Information	Chart positions		Oricon sales total
Year	Single Information	Oricon Singles Charts	Billboard Japan Hot 100	Oricon sales total
2009	"Katayoku no Tori" (片翼の鳥; "One-Winged Bird"): Anime Umineko no Naku Koro ni opening.; Released: August 19, 2009; Label: Frontier Works (FCCM-283)	11	71	23,000
2010	"Inori no Kanata" (祈りの彼方; "Beyond the Prayers"): Anime Tales of Symphonia (Tethe'alla Version) ending.; Released: April 28, 2010; Label: Frontier Works (FCCM-314)	19	—	9,100
2011	"Utsusemi" (空蝉; "The cast-off shell of a cicada"): Anime Itsuka Tenma no Kuro Usagi ending.; Released: August 24, 2011; Label: Frontier Works (MFCZ-1011)	—	—	—
2015	"Akatsuki" (暁, "Dawn"): Anime Akatsuki no Yona: Yona of the Dawn ending.; Released: April 29, 2015			

== Other appearances ==
=== Soundtrack appearances ===
Release	Soundtrack	Notes
2005	Shadow Hearts: From the New World Original Soundtracks	Contributed songs 1-01. "From the New World"; 1-02. "Et Unam (Chant of Icaro)"; 1-03. "Great Ghost Dance" (with Icaro); 1-10. "Thunder Bird"; 1-11. "Oh Smania! oh Furie! (D'Oreste e d'Aiace)"; 1-20. "Ta Tanka"; 1-31. "La Sirene"; 2-14. "Tirawa"; 2-22. "Lady Tears I"; 2-23. "Lady Tears II"; 2-28. "Un gemito dell'estinto" Features in chorus, except for full soprano vocals on track #1-11.
2005	Near Death Experience, Shadow Hearts Arrangetracks	Contributed songs: 03. "The Wheel of Fortune - Fortuna"; 10. "The 3Karma - Cogito, ergo sum" Shadow Hearts soundtrack rearrangement CD. Features in chorus.
2005	Ar tonelico Sekai no Owari de Utai Tsuzukeru Shōjo Original Soundtrack	Contributed songs 1-01. "Utau Oka" (謳う丘, Singing Hills); 1-31. "Atashi no Sekai wa Nozomu ga Manma" (あたしの世界は望むがまんま, My World is What I Wish); 2-27. "Tsugau Inochi no Koe AE" (つがう命の声 AE, Paired Voices of Life AE); 2-28. "Maikana, Paradox" (迷奏・パラドックス, Lost Performance, Paradox); 2-37. "Tsugau Inochi no Koe" (つがう命の声, Paired Voices of Life); 2-39. "Phantasmagoria" (ファンタスマゴリア, Fantasumagoria) Full vocals on tracks #1-01, #2-27, #2-37. Chorus vocals on tracks #1-31, #2-28, #2-39.
2006	Tsukikanade: Ar tonelico Hymmnos Concert Side Red	Contributed songs: 08. "Exec_Phantasmagoria/."; Ar tonelico vocal album.
2006	Hoshiyomi: Ar tonelico Hymmnos Concert Side Blue	Contributed songs: 02. "Utau Oka (Harmonics Eolia)" (謳う丘 -Harmonics EOLIA-, Singing Hills); 03. "Exec_Chronicle_Key/."; 06. "Exec_Paja/.#Misya extracting" 07. "Exec_Harmonius/."; 02. "Hoshiyomi" (星詠～ホシヨミ～, Singing the Stars~Hoshiyomi); Ar tonelico vocal album.
2006	Hanakisō Kōkyōkyoku	Contributed songs: 02. "Kyūseishu (Hana Shiro)" (救世主-花白-, Saviour (Hanashiro)); Hanakisō soundtrack orchestra rearrangement album. Songs composed by Shikata. Tracks 1,3 and 7 arranged by Shikata.
2007	Ar tonelico II: Melody of Metafalica Original Soundtrack	Contributed songs 1-01. "Utau Oka (Harmonics Frelia)" (謳う丘～Harmonics FRELIA～, Singing Hills); 1-21. "Koi Moyō (Haru)" (恋模様～春～, Love Pattern (Spring)); 1-35. "Mayonaka no Naishobanashi" (真夜中の内緒話, Secret Meeting at Midnight); 1-39. "Utamahō: Crescent Prisma" (詩魔法：クレセントプリズマ, Song Magic: Crescent Prisma); 1-40. "Utamahō: Infel Phira" (詩魔法：インフェル・ピラ, Song Magic: Infel Phira); 1-41. "Utamahō: Quasarlical" (詩魔法：クエーサーリカル, Song Magic: Quasarlical); 1-42. "Utamahō: Pepen" (詩魔法：ペペン, Song Magic: Pepen); 1-43. "Utamahō: Sun-sun-summon" (詩魔法：サンサンサモン, Song Magic: Sun-sun-summon); 1-49. "Utamahō: Demongel" (詩魔法：デモンジェル, Song Magic: Demongel); 1-50. "Utamahō: Invertbrid" (詩魔法：インバートブリッド, Song Magic: Invertbrid); 1-51. "Utamahō: Ikusa Megami" (詩魔法：戦女神, Song Magic: War Goddess); 1-52. "Utamahō: Phantasmagoria" (詩魔法：ファンタスマゴリア, Song Magic: Phantasmagoria); 2-13. "Akai Tsumeato" (紅い爪痕, Crimson Scars); 2-17. "Zawameku Dōki (Chroche)" (ざわめく動悸～クローシェ～, Fluttering Heartbeat); 2-26. "Koi Moyō (Fuyu)" (恋模様～冬～, Love Pattern (Winter)); 2-33. "Exec_with.Method_Metafalica/."
2007	Homura: Homura Ar tonelico II Hymmnos Concert Side Red	Contributed songs: 06. "Exec_with.Method_Metafalica/."; 10. "Exec_Harmonius_Fyusion/."; Ar tonelico II vocal album. Full vocals on #6, composed intro to #10.
2007	Mio Ar tonelico II Hymmnos Concert Side Blue	Contributed songs: 02. "Utau Oka (Harmonics Frelia)" (謳う丘～Harmonics FRELIA～, Singing Hills); 03. "Method_Implanta/."; 04. "Method_Metafalica/."; 05. "Method_Replekia/."; 06. "Exec_Over.Method_Sublimation/. (Lamenza)"; 07. "Exec_Over.Method_Sublimation/. (Ee Wassa Sos Yehar)"; 08. "Exec_Over.Method_Sublimation/. (Omness Chs .Ciel Sos Infel)"; 09. "Mio" (澪～MIO, Waterway); Ar tonelico II vocal album. Full vocals on all songs.
2010	Ar tonelico III Original Soundtrack	Contributed songs 1-01. "Utau Oka (Harmonics Tilia)" (謳う丘～Harmonics TILIA～, Singing Hills); 1-26. "Nyamo no Uta" (にゃものうた, Nyamo's Song); 1-56. "Nijiiro Crayon" (虹色クレヨン, Rainbow Crayon)
2010	Sakiya=Rumei Ar tonelico III hymmnos concert side Blue	Contributed songs: 02. "Utau Oka (Harmonics Tilia)" (謳う丘～Harmonics TILIA～, Singing Hills); 03. "Exec_Ep=Nova/."; 04. "Exec_Flip_Arphage/."; 05. "Toki no Suna" (トキノスナ, Sands of Time); 10. "Ec Tisia"; Ar tonelico III vocal album. Full vocals on all songs.
2010	Beatmania IIDX 17: Sirius Original Soundtrack	Contributed songs: 27. "Raison d'etre (Kōsasuru Shukumei)" (Raison d'etre ～交差する宿命～, Reason for Being (Crossing Fates))

=== Miscellaneous appearances ===
Release	Title	Notes	Album
2006	"Sōheki no Mori" (蒼碧の森, Pale Blue Forest)	Later appears on Raka with a completely different arrangement.	Summermix Vol. 01
2009	"Turii (Panta rhei) Tūri to Hoshi no Tami" (Turii (Panta rhei) トゥーリと星の民, Turii and the People of the Stars)		The Epic of Zektbach: Ristaccia
2011	Raison d'être (交差する宿命)		The Epic of Zektbach: Masinowa
