= Atelier Iris 3: Grand Phantasm =

2006 video game

- Developer: Gust Co. Ltd.
- Publishers: JP: Gust Co. Ltd.; NA: NIS America; AU: THQ; EU: Koei
- Director: Kazushige Masuda
- Producers: Tomohiko Yoshida; Tadanobu Inoue
- Programmer: Yuji Higuchi
- Artists: Yuko Tsujita; Yasuhiro Nakai; Jun Futaba
- Writers: Teruo Akaike; Kazushige Masuda
- Composer: Ken Nakagawa
- Series: Atelier
- Platform: PlayStation 2
- Release: JP: June 29, 2006; NA: May 29, 2007; AU: July 26, 2007; EU: August 3, 2007
- Genre: Role-playing
- Mode: Single-player

Atelier Iris 3: Grand Phantasm (Note: Known in Japan as Atelier Iris: Grand Fantasm (Note: Japanese: イリスのアトリエ グランファンタズム, Hepburn: Irisu no Atorie Guran Fantazumu)) is a role-playing video game developed by Japanese developer Gust Co. Ltd. for the PlayStation 2. Released in 2006 in Japan, despite the name the game is unconnected to Atelier Iris: Eternal Mana and Atelier Iris 2: The Azoth of Destiny.

== Gameplay ==
Atelier Iris 3 is a turn-based role-playing game. The player controls a team of three characters who gain experience, levels, and access to new equipment and abilities as the game progresses. Rather than rounds of combat where each character takes a single action, time is tracked in battle fluidly, with faster characters able to act more often, certain actions taking effect faster or slower, different recharge rates on the next turn, and so on. There is a skill gauge that is shared among all members of the party that increases as the party attacks and takes damage, but can be spent for powerful abilities. There is also a burst gauge that fills slowly, but when it hits its maximum, the enemies are stunned, the skill gauge is set to the maximum, and the party members are given an exceptionally large boost to their skill damage.

Out of combat, the characters undertake missions from a guild that generally involve visiting Alterworlds, which are similar to parallel dimensions reached via magic gates. The game is separated into chapters; some of these missions advance the plot, and upon completing enough plot missions, a new chapter is entered, which often opens up a new Alterworld to explore. The party is attempting to explore Alterworlds to find gems to empower Iris's Libram of Escalario, a magical book that is said to grant a wish if all eight gems are found.

== Characters ==
Unlike previous games in the series, the maximum number of playable characters is three. However, to compensate for the fewer number of characters, Edge and Nell can equip various "Blades" which can change their combat style and skills as they make pacts with Mana spirits.

- Edge Vanhite (エッジ・ヴァンハイト, Ejji Vanhaito)

Edge is a 19-year old Raider exploring the Alterworlds. After losing his family at a young age, he has since been living with Iris. He's quiet and his honest personality makes him seem unfriendly but deep down is kind and sensible at heart. He eventually falls in love with Iris.

- Iris Fortner (イリス・フォルトナー, Irisu Forutonā)

Iris is a 16-year old Raider and companion of Edge. Growing up in an alchemist family, she can perform simple synthesis. She has an optimistic and straightforward personality but is a little clumsy. While she shares her first name with Iris Blanchimont from Atelier Iris and Atelier Iris 2, she is a separate and unrelated character.

- Nell Ellis (ネル・エルエス, Neru Eruesu)

Nell is a 15-year old Raider who works with her older sister Yula to rebuild their family wealth. She is an energetic girl often lacking seriousness. After getting into a fight with her sister, she joins the party in Chapter 3.

== Music ==
The soundtrack was mainly composed by Ken Nakagawa with the opening song composed by Revo and two other vocal songs composed by Daisuke Achiwa. It was released June 21, 2006 in Japan by TEAM Entertainment.

- Opening song: schwarzweiß (Kiri no Mukou ni Tsunagaru Sekai) (schwarzweiß～霧の向こうにつながる世界～, schwarzweiß (Worlds Connected Beyond the Mist)) by Haruka Shimotsuki+Revo
- Insert song: Flowers in the Rain by Rekka Katakiri

Ending songs:

- Lorelei by Noriko Mitose (Normal Ending)
- Taisetsuna Kotoba (大切なことば, Precious Words) by Yuuko Ishibashi (True Ending)

== Reception ==
Reception

Aggregate score
Aggregator	Score
Metacritic	63/100

Review scores
Publication	Score
Electronic Gaming Monthly	4.83/10
Eurogamer	5/10
Famitsu	32/40
Game Informer	6.5/10
GamePro	3.5/5
GameSpot	6.2/10
GameSpy	2/5
GameTrailers	7/10
GameZone	8.1/10
IGN	6/10
PlayStation: The Official Magazine	7/10
RPGamer	2/5
RPGFan	84%

The game received "mixed" reviews according to the review aggregation website Metacritic. In Japan, Famitsu gave it a score of all four eights for a total of 32 out of 40. In general, reviewers felt that the gameplay in Atelier Iris 3 was stronger than the first two games of the series, but its plot and characters were significantly weaker. While the gameplay was generally praised, it was also criticized for being a touch too easy and lacking in difficulty. The graphics were also considered to be a touch on the simple side for a PlayStation 2 game, although this was not unusual for the series which did not sell itself on cutting-edge graphics.
