= Ar Tonelico: Melody of Elemia =

2006 video game

Ar tonelico: Melody of Elemia
- Developer: Gust Co. Ltd.
- Publishers: JP: Banpresto; NA: NIS America; EU: 505 Games
- Director: Akira Tsuchiya
- Producers: Tadanobu Inoue; Atsunori Kawachi
- Designers: Akira Tsuchiya; Yoshito Okamura; Teruaki Nakai
- Programmers: Yuji Higuchi; Teruaki Nakai; Naoya Harasawa
- Artists: Megumi Maruta; Yuuko Tsujida; Aki Takahashi
- Writers: Akira Tsuchiya; Teruo Akaike; Kei Tanaka
- Series: Ar tonelico
- Platform: PlayStation 2
- Release: JP: January 26, 2006; NA: February 6, 2007; EU: May 22, 2007
- Genre: Role-playing
- Mode: Single player

Ar tonelico: Melody of Elemia, released in Japan as Ar tonelico: The Girl Who Keeps Singing at the End of the World (Note: Japanese: アルトネリコ世界の終わりで詩い続ける少女, Hepburn: Aru toneriko Sekai no Owari de Utai Tsuzukeru Shōjo) is a role-playing video game developed by Gust Corporation for the PlayStation 2 and originally published by Banpresto in 2006. There are other media releases based on the game, including the manga Ar tonelico -arpeggio-, the anime OVA Ar tonelico, and several drama CDs.

At E3 2006, Nippon Ichi Software America (NIS America) announced that it would pick up Ar tonelico, with an expected release date on October 31, 2006. However, that release was delayed until February 6, 2007, to provide more time for localization. The European version was released by 505 Games on May 22, 2007. However, it was released in very limited quantities only in France, Italy, and Spain and as such European copies of the game are rare and the very existence of the PAL version remained widely unnoticed.

A sequel titled Ar tonelico II: Melody of Metafalica was released in Japan in 2007. A second sequel, Ar tonelico Qoga: Knell of Ar Ciel was released in 2011.

== Gameplay ==
=== Exploration ===
Players may explore dungeons and other areas by moving in any direction and jumping. Depending on the abilities of the Reyvateils in the party, various spells can also be cast to light candles, remove obstacles, and trigger switches. Enemy creatures may be encountered at random as the player explores an area. A gauge in the lower-right corner of the screen indicates the likelihood of encountering an enemy, as well as the number of random encounters remaining in the current area. Once enough battles have been fought to empty the gauge, no further random encounters will take place until the player leaves and returns to the area.

Each town presents several points of interest that may be reached by selecting their name on a menu, then navigated like a field map. Additional points of interest may become available after certain conditions are met. The world map provides a 3D view of the world, which lists all of the locations currently accessible by the player. Most previously visited locations can be reached simply by scrolling the map to its entrance, then choosing to enter it.

=== Combat ===
Mid-battle with Lyner, Jack, Radolf, and Aurica in the Lower World

Ar tonelico features a turn-based battle system akin to those of the Atelier Iris series. The active party consists of up to three fighters in the front and one Reyvateil in the back. An action can be chosen for each fighter as their turn arrives. An action bar at the top of the screen indicates the turn order for every character and opponent involved in the battle. Fighters may choose to strike the enemy, defend themselves, use a skill, use an item, or to protect the Reyvateil.

As long as any fighters remain alive, the Reyvateil can not be attacked directly by the enemy, and can only be targeted by charged attacks. When targeted, a number of circles are shown around her to indicate the number of fighters that must protect her (instead of attacking) before the enemy's next turn to completely block the attack. A successful defense grants the fighters an option to mount a devastating counter-attack at the cost of one harmocrystal.

Harmocrystals are activated when the Reyvateil and the rest of the party work well together, a measure of which is represented by the Harmonics bar at the bottom of the screen. Harmonics improve with each successful attack from the fighters, defense of the Reyvateil, and gradually over time, but decreases whenever an enemy lands a successful attack. When the bar fills, the party's attacks become stronger and one harmocrystal is activated. The number of active Harmocrystals affects the number of counter-attacks the party can mount, the skills available to each fighter, as well as the types of items received at the end of a battle. A higher level of Harmonics also allows the Reyvateil to sing faster.

Unlike fighter characters, the Reyvateil does not need to wait for her turn and can be given commands at any time during the battle. Instead of attacking directly, she supports the party by using Song Magic. Her MP will decrease as long as she is singing, and stopping the Song will cause her MP to recover over time. Red Magic can be charged for any length of time before being released onto the enemy as an attack, whereas Blue Magic immediately takes effect and remains in effect as long as the singing continues. Both kinds of magic become progressively stronger as the Reyvateil continues to sing the same Song, and power up faster with each incremental level of Harmonics. Stopping or changing the Song will cause the next spell to begin powering up from its basic level. The Reyvateils practice magic by "singing it". Hymns and Song Magic are powerful, they can be used for killing and healing. Therefore, unlike many other games, the songs form an integral part of the gameplay and story.

At the end of each battle, experience points are awarded to all party members regardless of whether they participated in battle, and extra points are granted to those who killed enemies. Dive Points are awarded to all Reyvateils currently in the party, which can then be used for Diving. Items are awarded based on the number of activated Harmocrystals at the end of each battle. Each enemy has a potential of dropping up to 4 items, with the fourth item usually being the most desirable.

=== Diving ===
Diving is a unique aspect of Ar tonelico's gameplay experience. By visiting a Dive Shop, the player can enter a Reyvateil's mind, also called a Cosmosphere or a Soulspace. The Diving experience shares many similarities with Japanese visual novels, which puts great emphasis on dialogue and character development. The player spends Dive Points to enter different locations within the Cosmosphere. In order to enter deeper levels of the Cosmosphere, the player must improve their relationship with the Reyvateil by gaining Dive Points from combat and having conversations with her while resting at inns and camps.

Despite being similar to a visual novel, the objective is not to date the Reyvateils, but to help them resolve their inner doubts and concerns. Doing so will allow the Reyvateils to craft new Song Magic as well as unlock new outfits, which act like improved equipment in battle. Many of the outfits are based on Japanese Moe-Archetypes from more familiar ones such as school uniforms, to mascot-like costumes and nightshirts.

== Plot ==
=== Setting ===
Ar tonelico takes place in the world of Sol Ciel (ソル・シエール), which literally translates to "Sun Sky" in Latin and French, respectively, but means "Shining Sky/World" in the game's own language. The world consists of the living Tower of Ar tonelico and the Wings of Horus, a landmass connected to the lower portion of the Tower. Each section of the world above and below The Wings of Horus is designated with a specific name. The lower world is known for its small towns and is not considered to be very technologically advanced. The upper world is very advanced, and the Floating City of Platina is even considered to be a holy sanctuary by the Church of Elemia from the lower world. The Tower exists at the center of the world and is made from technology that was available prior to the world-destroying catastrophe known as the Grathnode Inferia. There is little land left after the two catastrophes of the past, so people have become increasingly dependent on Ar tonelico. The Tower functions much like a computer program, and is susceptible to viruses which are emerging at an alarming rate to wreak havoc on both the upper and lower worlds.

The world of Sol Ciel is inhabited by two main races: Human and Reyvateil (レーヴァテイル). Reyvateils are a manufactured race who were originally created to maintain Ar tonelico. They are designed to resemble humans in every way except for their lifespan and their ability to communicate with the Tower. All Reyvateils are female regardless of their birth history. There are three different types of Reyvateils. Reyvateil Origins are the original Reyvateils who were created with a specific purpose in mind. They have a perfect connection to the Tower. They are considered the parents of all β-type and Third Generation Reyvateils because the lower class Reyvateils are in some way related to them. The second type, β-type Reyvateils, are clones of Reyvateil Origins. They are mortal, though they still live significantly longer than humans; approximately 150 years. The last type, Third Generation Reyvateils, are born from relationships between humans and Reyvateils. Due to the strain that the power of Ar tonelico puts on their bodies, they tend to have naturally short life spans of only 14 to 20 years. There is a life-extending agent called Diquility that can only be produced by the Church of Elemia (エル・エレミア教会, Eru Eremia-kyoukai) and the Tenba Conglomerate (天覇, Tenpa), but it must be applied every 3 months, and the cost of obtaining it is prohibitive. Consequently, many Third Generation Reyvateils choose to join one of the above-mentioned organizations in order to obtain Diquility for free.

=== Characters ===
Ar tonelico has eight playable characters, but many more are important to the storyline. The main protagonist is Lyner Barsett, a Knight of Elemia who fell from Platina when attempting to destroy one of the viruses, who was then saved by a reyvateil, Aurica Nestmile. He meets Aurica Nestmile and Misha Arsellec Lune in the lower world, both of whom are Reyvateils. These two become very important characters, and the player must interact with them on a regular basis by conversing and Diving in order to progress through the game.

Other playable characters include Jack Hamilton, a lone gunner; Krusche Elendia, an airship grathmelder; Radolf Schnaizen, a Cardinal with the Church of Elemia; Shurelia, the Tower's administrator; and Ayatane Michitaka, a fellow Knight of Elemia. The main antagonist is Mir, a β-type Reyvateil who was created as a selfless servant to humanity, but has since developed a genocidal hatred for the human race as a result of her mistreatment at their hands.

== Soundtrack ==
The soundtrack of the game was mostly composed by the members of the Gust Sound Team - Akira Tsuchiya, Ken Nakagawa and Daisuke Achiwa, who are best known for composing music for Gust's Atelier series. Haruka Shimotsuki, Takashige Inagaki and Akiko Shikata also contributed composition for several of the songs and Hymns in the game. As well as the choral Hymns, the soundtrack features a variety of musical genres ranging from rock, electronica, industrial and rap to ethnic, acoustic, orchestral and folk styles. Each Reyvateil has their own singer (who is different from their voice actor in both Japanese and English versions) who performed their Songs and Hymns: "Aurica": Haruka Shimotsuki, "Misha": Akiko Shikata, "Shurelia": Noriko Mitose and "Claire": Yūko Ishibashi.

The music of the game was released across three albums: a 2-disc original soundtrack and two Hymmnos Concert CDs. The Hymmnos Concert CDs contained all the Hymns and songs which were absent from the OST.

=== Other media ===
There have been a variety of media releases for Ar tonelico, including soundtrack CDs, drama CDs, an OVA, and a manga.

== Reception ==
Reception

Aggregate score
Aggregator	Score
Metacritic	71/100

Review scores
Publication	Score
GameSpot	6.3/10
IGN	7.2/10
RPGamer	3/5
RPGFan	91%
VGRC	8/10

Ar tonelico has been criticized by some reviewers for being too easy and not presenting much of a challenge. GameSpot opined "there's no challenge whatsoever to the battles, constant use of overt sexual innuendo isn't the least bit clever or entertaining, and the courtship aspect of the game makes very little sense," with IGN chiming in that "some game flaws in standard RPG elements, like the battle system and exploration keep this from being a stand out game." On the other hand, it has been looked upon kindly by other members of the press, with VGRC stating "if you're looking for the next epic RPG, you will not find it here. However, if you want something fresh in this tired and stale genre, Ar tonelico will most certainly deliver."
