= Ar Tonelico Qoga =

2010 video game

Ar Tonelico Qoga: Knell of Ar Ciel
- European cover art
- Developers: Gust Co. Ltd. Banpresto
- Publishers: JP: Namco Bandai Games; NA: NIS America; EU: NIS America
- Directors: Akira Tsuchiya; Akatsuki Tsuchiya
- Producer: Atsunori Kawachi
- Composers: Ken Nakagawa; Kazuki Yanagawa
- Series: Ar tonelico
- Engine: PhyreEngine
- Platform: PlayStation 3
- Release: JP: January 28, 2010; NA: March 15, 2011; EU: April 1, 2011
- Genre: Action role-playing
- Mode: Single-player

Ar Tonelico Qoga: Knell of Ar Ciel (Note: Japanese: アルトネリコ3 世界終焉の引鉄は少女の詩が弾く, Hepburn: Aru Toneriko Surī: Sekai Shūen no Hikigane wa Shōjo no Uta ga Hiku; lit. "Ar tonelico III: The Girl's Song that Pulls the Trigger of World's Demise") is an action role-playing game produced by Gust and published by Namco Bandai Games in Japan and by NIS America in North America for the Sony PlayStation 3. It is the third and final installment of the Ar Tonelico trilogy, taking place in the Reyvateil-ruled country of Clustania, located in an area known as Sol Cluster, and set around two and half years after the events of Ar tonelico II. Clustania is situated on the third tower in the world of Ar Ciel, which floats above the uninhabitable Sea of Death. Although it is the final game in the series, the series mythos is continued in Gust's Surge Concerto series through the titles, Ciel Nosurge and Ar Nosurge, which takes place within the same universe. The Japanese version became available for retail on January 28, 2010 and it was released in North America on March 15, 2011. It was released in Europe on April 1, 2011.

== Gameplay ==
=== Diving ===
During the game, Aoto, the protagonist, can dive into the 'Cosmospheres' of certain Reyvateils to craft Song Magic, which is done by witnessing their internal turmoils and traumas and helping them to find a solution for them. Various personae exist within the Cosmosphere, and the player can choose to have the Reyvateil fight in their clothing. Because the personae who wear these costumes have differing preferences in 'Song Magic', the costume will influence the RAH. system. Diving additionally deepens the bond between the Reyvateil and the protagonist. However, unlike the previous games, the player can only gain Hyumas in the Cosmosphere because the Song Magic used by each Reyvateil and their persona is preset and unmodifiable.

=== Talk Topics ===
The system for conversation is similar to those of the other games in the series, with the difference being only three Talk Topics are now required for entering the next Cosmosphere level, regardless of what number that level is. Each topic is classified by color to indicate how they are found:

- Pink colored topics are triggered by progressing through the main storyline
- Green colored topics are obtained by having specific items in the inventory or meeting certain conditions
- Blue colored topics are found as shining orbs throughout the maps

Talk Topics for the rest of the party members now exist, as opposed to the previous games. The updated Talk Topics system now includes talk topics between all members of the party, instead of topics between the party's Reyvateils and the main character. Conversations between party members are triggered after the player talks to certain non-playable characters or after certain events.

=== Battle System ===
The battle system is real-time based, similar to those of the Star Ocean games. Only one Reyvateil can be present in battle. During a battle, the player controls one of three Vanguard (support/attacking) members and is able to switch control to another character at will. The non-player members of the party are controlled by AI. In battle, the player may attack enemies with an equipped weapon (with successive attacks resulting in a shot combo), protect the Reyvateil from enemy attacks by using a Blowback, or use the Song Magic of the Reyvateil. Items may be used to heal party members or damage enemies.

Additionally, the player can make the Reyvateil Purge (shed off part of her clothes) in order to increase the power of her Song Magic. To do this, the player has the attack the enemies whenever a red wave makes contact with the red line in the Harmograph located in the lower part of the screen. Doing this will trigger a Beat Up, which represents the heart of the Reyvateil becoming more excited upon seeing the party members fight hard for her. Once enough Beat Ups have been accumulated, a Purge Ready! notification will appear over the Heart Indicator located at the right of the Harmograph. When this happens, the player has to hold one of the shoulder buttons (L1, R1, R2 or L2) and shake the controller. If they did it correctly, the Reyvateil will Purge part of her clothes, the Burst Gauge will increase its charge speed, the Song Magic will level up to its next stage, and the party will gain an additional elemental attack and resistance depending on which button they held for executing the Purge (L1: Fire, L2: Wind, R1: Ice, R2: Lightning). However, if the Purge was performed incorrectly, the Reyvateil will refuse to Purge and the Song Magic will be released with less power than if it was used normally, so the player has to be careful.

Initially, Reyvateil Purge may only be used once; however, up to four levels of Purge and a multi-level Purge may be unlocked by advancing through the Cosmosphere of the Reyvateil. At the Reyvateil's fourth-level Purge, she will unleash her Song Magic Flipsphere, requiring the player to attack in sync with the pulsing of the Harmograph line. Depending on player execution, this results in additional or fewer attacks and may include a finishing blow.

Finally, some enemies can use powerful attacks that can hit the entire player party but require a charge time. When they are charging the attack, they will be surrounded by a blue barrier while a blue line appears on the Harmograph. During this time, the Burst Gauge is slowed down and Purging is disabled, so the player has to attack the enemy to break the barrier and nullify the attack. If they don't manage to do so before the blue line makes contact with the border of the Harmograph, the enemy will unleash the attack.

The Reyvateils are by themselves defenseless, so they must be defended by the player. Therefore, if all three Vanguard characters fall in battle (their HP reaches 0), the game is over, regardless of whether the Reyvateil is alive or not.

When an enemy enters the field surrounding the Reyvateil, an alarm will begin sounding as the HP of the Reyvateil begins being drained away while the Burst Gauge begins decreasing. As the Reyvateil can easily die in these conditions, the player can attack the enemy to get it away from her or activate the Blowback skill, which will teleport the player to the Reyvateil's side and execute a blow that will send the enemy to the opposite side of the battlefield. Once used, the Blowback skill must recharge.

==== RAH System ====
The acronym stands for "Real-time Active Hymmnetics", and it refers to the fact that the music used during battles, with the exception of the one used in some special events, is variable: each playable Reyvateil will begin singing at the start of battle a melody that will change depending on the actions taken by the player. Each Reyvateil has a base melody, but it can be modified by programming Hyumas into them. The Hyumas, aside of modifying the instrumentation, pitch, and rhythm of the melody, also grants bonuses to the party members when they are activated through the Purge System: periodical HP regeneration, resistance to status ailments, increases of attack and defense... such are what the Hyumas can do upon their activation.

== Setting ==
Ar tonelico Qoga takes place in the region of Sol Cluster of Planet Ar Ciel, the location of the third and final Tower of Ar tonelico, two years after the conclusion of Ar tonelico II: Melody of Metafalica. This is a harsh region, comprising a mountainous formation called the Great Fang and the Third Tower of Ar tonelico, which also receives the name Tower of Harvestasha.

The entire region is under the dominion of the Reyvateil-ruled country of Clustania, located in the upper zones of the Tower, and its army periodically goes to the Great Fang to destroy the towns that have grown to much and to take its inhabitants as prisoners. Afterward executing them or subjecting them to a brainwashing process known as Purification, in which its victims lose their own ego and become vegetables.

The Great Fang is formed by several small villages and towns, the largest cities being the underground complex known as the Eternus Shaft and the port city of Ciela Gate. However, the villages see constant destruction as described above, while the Eternus Shaft is out of their reach due to its underground location, and Ciela Gate is under the protection of the Archia Corporachy.

The Archia Corporarchy is the only human settlement found in the Tower of Harvestasha, located around its middle zone, and it is the only place in which humans can live without fearing the Purification done by the Clustanians, as long as they don't try to ascend the Tower.

=== Plot ===
The players will take on the role of a young steeplejack apprentice called Aoto, who upon getting awakened by a ruckus outside his house, goes to investigate to find out that Clustanian soldiers are attacking an old man and girl that looks like a swordswoman. After managing to drive them away, the swordswoman transforms into a girl called Saki, while the old man, Kiraha, dies from the wounds the Clustanians caused him, leaving Saki's care on Aoto's hands, while also leaving to him a pendant he asks him to take to his son.

Aoto tries to head to the airbus terminal in order to run away from his village with Saki before the Clustanians catch them, where he meets a friend of his called Tatsumi. However, soon they are surrounded by the Clustanians, and Saki demonstrates an unusual power: by praying and using the Purge power, she transforms several of the Clustanian soldiers and their machines into cakes, making her fall unconscious, but allowing a very confused Aoto and Tatsumi to make their escape. After they get away from the village, Saki wakes up, unable to remember anything about Kiraha or the events that just took place, so Tatsumi advises Aoto taking her to a Reyvateil doctor he knows at Eternus Shaft. However, neither of them knew that this would make them embark into a journey that would reveal why the Clustanians restricted so much the life of the humans, the shady plans that were being orchestrated at Archia Corporarchy, as well as also making them collaborate with people from the regions of Sol Ciel and Metafalss into an endeavor that would decide if their planet, Ar Ciel, would survive or die the next year.

== Characters ==
Aoto (蒼都)

The main character of the game and a steeplejack apprentice from Blue Canyon Hamlet. He is reckless, but always finishes what he starts. He never liked Clustania, and after meeting Saki, he starts to view Clustania as an enemy.

Saki (咲)

A main heroine and Reyvateil who was created in a research institute for a project that would have a great impact on the world. She escaped before the project was executed and was on the run for several years before she met Aoto. When she's extremely emotionally strained, she can use a power known as Miracle.

Sarapatra (サラパトゥール, Sarapatūru)

One of Saki's personae.
The big sis personality, for Saki that always tries to hide her feelings. She is the one who gives Saki advice about love.

Filament (フィラメント, Firamento)

One of Saki's personae.
She is the persona that isolates all of the pain that Saki can't bear. She knows a lot of things that Saki doesn't know and helps her friends with that knowledge. She resembles a nun with a bandaged eye.

Sakia Lumei (サキア・ルメイ, Sakia Rumei)

One of Saki's personae.
She is the opposite of Saki. She is a stubborn persona and shows up when Saki is in danger to beat up her enemies.

Finnel (フィンネル, Finneru)

Another main heroine and a clumsy β-type Reyvateil who works in a restaurant known as Yokkora Bistro, which is situated on the Eternus Shaft. She seemingly has a significant connection to the existence of Clustania.

Yurisica (ユリシカ, Yurishika)

One of Finnel's personae.
She seems to seek some kind of help from Aoto. Her appearance is that of a nurse.

Soma (ソーマ, Sōma)

One of Finnel's personae.
She is feared by the others as the Clustania's assassin. Despite wearing a clown outfit, her movements are very fast.

Suzunomia (スズノミア)

One of Finnel's personae.
A mysterious persona that rarely appears. She seeks to achieve the only objective that she remembers. She looks a bit like a priestess.

Hikari Gojō (光五条)

A doctor specialized in Reyvateils. He opens his business in a place called Tokoshie Canopy. He used to work at Arkia but after knowing Arkia's great secret he decided to retire from it.

Tatsumi (タツミ)

A fan of V-board, a sport that enables the player to freely run in the air. He is currently training in Blue Valley Village. He respects Gengai as a teacher, and one month before the game starts he met Aoto.

Gengai (ゲンガイ)

The commander of the Great Fang Alliance. He helps those who are being oppressed by the Cleansing (Urban destruction) caused by the Reyvateils.

Raphael (ラファエーレ, Rafaēre)

The head of Arkia Research Laboratory. It is his counter-measure that enables the peoples to live in peace, he is trusted by the townspeople.

Richaryosha (リッカリョーシャ, Rikkaryōsha)

A Reyvateil that has the position of No. 2 in Arkia, she admires a love that surpasses trials, kinda like a drama. She even encourages it to her surroundings. She calls Hikari Gojo "Doctor", indicating a possible relationship between them.

Akane (アカネ)

A Reyvateil that is also the commander of Anti Human Troops. She is born at the same time as Finnel is, she is hard on others and views those who come into the position as irregulars.

Kukurou (ククロウ)

Akane's loyal pet. It takes the form of an antivirus when in battle mode.

Teppo (テポ, Tepo)

A plugin for the Dive Machines made by Hikari Gojo, which allows him to scan a Reyvateil's personalities.
Name "TEPO" in the Japanese Ver. is an abbreviated form of "Cosmosphere Analyzer, Trans Encorder, and Program Optimizer".

Cocona Bartel (ココナ・バーテル, Kokona Bāteru)
Now older, Cocona came to Sol Cluster by the request of Jacqli, along with Sasha. She has the mission of bringing a special crystal called the Heart of Gaea to a person called Harvestasha.

Sasha (沙亜紗（さーしゃ）, Sāsha)
Now older, Sasha came to Sol Cluster with Cocona. She opened a synthesis store called "Nya Nya Ya" in the Capo Waste Oil Hot Spring.

Mute (ミュート, Myūto)
A Third Generation Reyvateil that is constantly trying to capture Saki, as she was ordered to by Akane. Despite her monstrous appearance, she is quite feminine and is greatly enraged when anyone tries to say the opposite to her.

Tyria (ティリア, Tiria)
The Third Origin Reyvateil, and the Administrator of the Third Tower, located in Sol Cluster.

Jack Hamilton (ジャック・ハミルトン, Jakku Hamiruton)
4 years ago, he departed from Sol Ciel with Krusche and Jakuri. He is now at Sol Cluster with Krusche, apparently, because he is in love with her, despite his flirtatious nature still being the same.

Krusche Elendia (クルシェ・エレンディア, Kurushe Erendia)
4 years ago, Krusche decided to explore the world. She arrived at Sol Cluster with Jack. She used to work at Tenba, but she is currently in retirement.

Luphan (ルーファン, Rūfan)
A man who seems to know Gengai. Always helps Aoto's party whenever they get into trouble. However, he seems to hide other things...

Katene (カテナ, Katena)
An old friend of Hikari Gojou. He was recognized as a brilliant researcher and inventor because of the many medical artifacts for Reyvateils that he developed.

== Music ==
The soundtrack for the game was composed by the Gust Sound Team, though its configuration changed in comparison to the previous games: only Ken Nakagawa remained, as Akira Tsuchiya was busy being the director and main creator of all the aspects of the game, while Daisuke Achiwa was at the time working solo in the score for Atelier Lina. Newcomer Kazuki Yanagawa made his debut in this game, being responsible for several event and dungeon themes, as well as the sole composer of the samples used in the automatic music generation system known as the RAH System. Lifelong series singer Akiko Shikata contributed herself with a music box event piece as well, as also did doujin music composer HIR with a few themes.

For the Hymns, three of the singers employed so far in the series made a return: Akiko Shikata, Haruka Shimotsuki and Noriko Mitose, alongside which several new singers joined the team for the game: Kokia, Yoko Ueno, Au (from the Gusya Ningen band), Azumi Inoue, Noriko Fujimoto, Yula Yayoi, Rekka Katakiri and Haruka Togawa.

The music of the game was released in three discs: a two-disc original soundtrack alongside the usual Hymmnos Concert Side Red and Side Blue albums. Contrary to tradition, the original soundtrack contained only the opening theme alongside "best of" mixes of the RAH System samples and the instrumental BGMs, while the Hymmnos Concerts contained most of the Hymns sung in the game. However, a total of four songs, all of which were used during the final battle in the game, were absent from all media releases. The fourth and final song was released as a track in the image album Singing Hill ~Ar=Ciel Ar=Dor~, but the others never received an official release.

The musical style for this game runs similar to that of the previous ones, featuring orchestral, rock, electronica, ethnic, industrial, folk and choral styles.

== Media releases ==
Similarly to its predecessors, it received a large amount of related merchandise in the form of music CDs, as well as gag manga compilations, Drama CDs that told events that took place after the game's true ending, a Hymmnos Musical chronicling happenings between the events of Ar tonelico II: Melody of Metafalica, a player's guide, a setting materials book, and two novels that also served as an epilogue to the entire series.

== Reception ==
Reception

Aggregate scores
Aggregator	Score
GameRankings	66.00%
Metacritic	61 / 100

Review scores
Publication	Score
Destructoid	8 / 10
Famitsu	28 / 40
GamePro	3.5/5
GamesRadar+	7 / 10
IGN	6 / 10

The game has received generally mixed reviews, with a 65% on the aggregator GameRankings and a 60/100 Metacritic score. Famitsu magazine awarded the game a combined score of 28/40.

The game sold over 81,000 copies in Japan in its first week and has sold over 120,000 copies in total there.

It receives praise in the same areas as its predecessors, particularly the music, strong characters, and engaging storyline, though its characters have also come under criticism due to the focus on the alternate personae of the heroines. The gameplay is its most criticized aspect due to not being an evolution of the battle system used in Ar tonelico II, and instead being what players have come to call a "half-baked attempt at a real-time combat system", between the few attacks the players can use, the absence of multiple kinds of Song Magic and the lack of variety in enemy models.

Its localization hasn't been as severely criticized as Ar tonelico 2's due to the script being more polished in general, although it still has some flaws, such as translating some terms inconsistently, the translators and editors not following their word of correcting all the Hymmnos terms mistakes they had committed previously, and finally, a bug that causes the final level of a Cosmosphere to have desynchronization between the voiceovers and the written text due to having introduced an additional text box when playing through that section with the Japanese voices on.
