= Harmonia (album) =

Studio album by Akiko Shikata
- Released: March 18, 2009
- Genre: World, Folk, Neoclassical new age.
- Label: Avex Entertainment
- Producer: Akiko Shikata

Akiko Shikata chronology
Raka (2006)	Harmonia (2009)

Harmonia is the third major studio album by Japanese pop artist Akiko Shikata. It was released on March 18, 2009.

== Track listing ==
1. Chōwa ~Fūrai no Shirabe~ (調和～風来の調べ～, Harmony: Melody of Unpredictability)
2. Haruka naru Tabiji (遥かなる旅路, Distant Journey)
3. Kiseki (軌跡, Locus)
4. Kaze to Rashinban (風と羅針盤, The Wind and the Compass)
5. Chōwa ~Honō no Kyōmei~ (調和～焔の共鳴～, Harmony: Resonance of Flames)
6. Uzumibi (埋火, Buried Flame)
7. Replicare (レプリカーレ, Repurikare, Replicare)
8. Umineko no Naku Koro ni ~Rengoku~ (うみねこのなく頃に～煉獄～, When the Seagulls Cry: Purgatory)
9. Chōwa ~Utakata no Komoriuta~ (調和～泡沫の子守唄～, Harmony: Lullaby of Bubbles)
10. Kuon no Umi (久遠の海, Eternal Sea)
11. Aoiro Kanzume (アオイロ缶詰, Blue Tin)
12. Tsuisōka (追想花, Flower of Reminiscences)
13. Chōwa ~Daichi no Sanka~ (調和～大地の讃歌～, Harmony: Paean of Land)
14. Utau Oka ~Salavec Rhaplanca.~ (謳う丘～Salavec rhaplanca.～, Singing Hill ~Salavec rhaplanca~)
15. Amnesia
16. Chōwa ~Harmonia~ (調和～Harmonia～, Harmony: Harmonia)
17. Harmonia ~Mihatenu Chi e~ (Harmonia～見果てぬ地へ～, Harmonia: To the Endless Lands)
