= Akiko Shikata =

Japanese singer-songwriter and composer

- Born: Akiko Shikata (志方あきこ); 7 January; Tokyo, Japan
- Genres: World, folk, neoclassical new age
- Occupations: Singer-songwriter, composer
- Instruments: Music box, piano, harp, lute
- Years active: 2001–present
- Labels: Vagrancy (2001–present); Hats Unlimited (2005–2007); Frontier Works (2008–present); Avex Trax (2009–present)
- Website: http://shikata-akiko.com/

Akiko Shikata (志方あきこ, Shikata Akiko; born 7 January) is a Japanese singer-songwriter and composer, who is known for writing music for games and anime. She is best known for her contributions to the Ar tonelico, Shadow Hearts and Umineko no Naku Koro ni games, as well as anime adaptations of Umineko no Naku Koro ni, Akatsuki no Yona and Tales of Symphonia.

Shikata's music is known for its ethnic feel and complex vocal chorus work. In a single Shikata song, there may be as many as 200 separate vocal tracks recorded for it.

== Biography ==
Shikata was born in Tokyo. She first developed an interest in music when she was very little, after constantly singing with her mother. She was first interested in songs from Minna no Uta and later, when she learnt the piano, in classical music.

In 2001, she formed the independent label Vagrancy, associated with the dōjin music scene that makes independent music game releases. She originally had no intention of singing, but felt dissatisfied with creating songs just from synthesiser sounds.

Later in the year, she released her debut EP, Midori no Mori de Nemuru Tori, through her site. In the next few years, she released many works through her site, mostly instrumental albums performed with a music box. Her first full-length album Haikyo to Rakuen (2003) topped the charts at Japanese independent music download site Muzie for 24 months. In the same year, she worked on the soundtrack for the independent game "Hanakisō," her first major game-related work.

In 2004, she held her first ever live tour. In 2005, she debuted as a major label artist under the Hats Unlimited label run by violinist Taro Hakase. Her association with the label led to Shikata working on many game soundtracks, such as Shadow Hearts: From the New World and Ar tonelico: Melody of Elemia. Shikata continues to work with the Ar tonelico franchise today, releasing music for both the second and third games.

Her second major-label album, Raka, was released in 2006. It featured several songs from games (two songs used in Hanakisō, as well as a rearrangement of the opening theme song from Ar tonelico, "Utau Oka ~EXEC_HARVESTASYA/.~ (謳う丘～EXEC_HARVESTASYA/.～, Singing Hill)). It was her first top 40 album, ranking at #34 on the Oricon albums chart.

In 2007, Shikata became associated with the dōjin soft game Umineko no Naku Koro ni, releasing an EP featuring music from the game (including the eponymous theme song). This was her first top 30 release. In 2009, her third album Harmonia broke the top 20.

In 2009, Shikata made her first moves into singing for anime, with her first single "Katayoku no Tori" being used as the opening theme song for the anime adaptation of Umineko no Naku Koro ni. In 2010, her second single, "Inori no Kanata", was used as the ending theme song for Tales of Symphonia (Tethe'alla Version). In 2014, she composed the soundtrack for the anime television series Cross Ange.

She later composed the second ending theme “akatsuki” for the 2014/2015 anime Yona of the Dawn

== Discography ==
=== Studio albums ===
- 2001: Midori no Mori de Nemuru Tori (EP)
- 2003: Haikyo to Rakuen
- 2005: Navigatoria
- 2006: Raka
- 2009: Harmonia
- 2013: Turaida
- 2015: Wokashi
- 2018: Ayashi
- 2019: noAno

=== Soundtrack albums ===
- 2003: Hanakisō Sound Tracks
- 2008: Umineko no Naku Koro ni (EP)
- 2013: Ciel Nosurge Original Soundtracks Vol.1 (OST)

=== Compilation albums ===
- 2007: Istoria: Musa
- 2008: Kara*Cola: Hymmnos Orgel Collection
- 2010: Utau Oka: Ar=ciel Ar=dor
- 2011: Byakumu no Mayu ~Ricordando il Passato~
- 2011: Istoria ~Kalliope~
- 2012: Laylania

=== Instrumental albums ===
- 2002: Petit Fours (music box)
- 2003: Horizon Blue (music box)
- 2003: Kurenawi (instrumental)
- 2004: Viridian (music box)
- 2005: Wisteria (music box)
- 2007: Kalliope: Piano Concert (piano)
- 2007: Hanakisō Koukyoukyoku (orchestra)
- 2009: Fluff: Orgel Arrange Mini Album (EP) (music box)
- 2010: Nijiiro Crayon: Orgel Arrange Mini Album (EP) (music box)
- 2011: lirica: Orgel Arrange Mini Album (EP) (music box)
- 2012: Istoria ~Kalliope~ Orgel Collection (music box)
- 2013: Hagurumakan no Elde (music box)
- 2018: Yoimatsuri (music box)

=== Singles ===
- 2009: Katayoku no Tori
- 2010: Inori no Kanata
- 2011: Utsusemi
