= Ar Tonelico 2 =

2007 video game

Ar Tonelico II: Melody of Metafalica
- Developer: Gust
- Publishers: JP: Banpresto; NA: NIS America; EU: Koei Tecmo
- Series: Ar tonelico
- Platform: PlayStation 2
- Release: JP: October 25, 2007; NA: January 20, 2009; EU: June 5, 2009
- Genre: Role-playing
- Mode: Single-player

Ar tonelico II: Melody of Metafalica, known in Japan as Ar tonelico II: Sekai ni Hibiku Shōjo-tachi no Metafalica (Note: Japanese: アルトネリコ２ 世界に響く少女たちの創造詩（メタファリカ）, Hepburn: Aru toneriko Tsū Sekai ni Hibiku Shōjo-tachi no Metafarika; literally "Ar tonelico 2: The Girls' Metafalica that Echoes to the World", with "Metafalica" meaning "song of creation") is a role-playing video game, developed by Gust for the PlayStation 2 which was released in Japan on October 25, 2007, in North America on January 20, 2009, and was set to be released in the EU on 29 May 2009, but a problem with the barcode delayed it by a week. It is the sequel to Ar tonelico: Melody of Elemia, taking place roughly one and a half years after that game's canonical ending.

== Gameplay ==
Prerelease screenshot demonstrating the Ar tonelico II battle system in action. While several of the displays differ from the final version, it shows how different it is from the one used in the first Ar tonelico.

Though superficially similar to its predecessor in both aesthetics and style, Ar Tonelico II's battle system is new. The new version removed the ability to jump and its platforming sections. The field exploration marks indicating points of interest, the Camp Circles (which restore health, save the game, and offer gameplay tips), and the encounter bar (which indicates how many battles can be fought in that particular area) remain the same as in the previous game. In Ar Tonelico II, the player can control up to four characters in battle, in two pairs. Battles are divided into two phases. In the Attack Phase, characters can attack until the Time Gauge expires and the Defense Phase begins. The player defends the Reyvateils against attacks by pressing buttons indicated on the screen. The better the timing, the better the guard. Player receive special power upon filling the Emotion Indicator.

== Plot ==
=== Setting ===
The setting for the game is the same as the previous game: the planet of Ar Ciel, albeit centered on a different region this time. The Tower of Ar tonelico from Metafalss is different from the tower in the first game since it does not look like a tower initially, but still has some of the same essential facilities (Plasma Bell (represented as the Lift Generators) and Musical Corridor (called here the Wings of Hynemos)). The Song Magics are still used like programs, but in this tower there are two Song Magic servers: the Sol Marta server and the Infel Phira Server. The Sol Marta server is located in the upper zone of the tower, acting like a stationary satellite. However, Sol Marta is not a proper Song Magic server, and instead, it serves as a relay for the First Tower of Ar tonelico, which was the setting for the first game. On the other hand, the Infel Phira server is located in a satellite that orbits the sky around the tower and shares its name with said server. Given Sol Marta's purpose as a relay for the First Tower, it works with the same kind of hymmnos as it and executes the EXEC variety of hymns. On the other hand, the Infel Phira server works with another kind of hymmnos called the New Testament of Pastalie hymmnos, and executes the METHOD variety of hymns.

=== Story ===
The region of Metafalss (メタ ファルス, Meta Farusu) surrounds the second Tower of Ar tonelico, which is said to represent the Goddess Frelia of the Trio of Elemia. Reyvateil in this region have been succumbing to a raging Reyvateil-exclusive epidemic called the Infel Phira Dependency (I.P.D.). Croix, a Knight under the Grand Bell Church of Pastalia, is sent to find the source of the problem and contain the epidemic. There is more transpiring in this region than just the epidemic, however, and one mission will throw him into an adventure to unravel the mysteries of the planet Ar Ciel and seek out a legend handed down by the people of Metafalss: the lost Hymn of Metafalica.

=== Characters ===
As with the original Ar tonelico, II features eight playable characters and many more who are important to the story. Croix Bartel is the main protagonist, whose life is changed when a routine mission goes awry. He becomes involved with two Reyvateils named Cloche Leythal Pastalia and Luca Trulyworth.

== Music ==
The Gust sound team of Akira Tsuchiya, Ken Nakagawa and Daisuke Achiwa returned from the first game to compose the music for this game, as did Haruka Shimotsuki, Takashige Inagaki and Akiko Shikata for the composition of several of the songs and Hymns.

Like the soundtrack for Ar tonelico, the music of the game was released across three albums: a two-disc Original Soundtrack and two Hymnnos Concert CDs which contain all but one of the songs and Hymns that were absent from the OST. That missing song (titled "Emptiness") was later on released in one of Akiko Shikata's albums.

All four singers from the first game returned to sing the songs and Hymns of this game's Reyvateils: Luca - Haruka Shimotsuki, Cloche - Akiko Shikata, Jacqli - Noriko Mitose, Reisha and Frelia - Yuuko Ishibashi.

== Reception ==
Reception

Aggregate scores
Aggregator	Score
GameRankings	73% (19 reviews)
Metacritic	71% (17 reviews)

Review scores
Publication	Score
GamesRadar+	3.5/5
IGN	8.4/10
RPGamer	4/5
RPGFan	81%

The game was praised in Japan. The U.S. release was also well-received, but many fans have criticized its localization for bugs and glitches. The accuracy of some aspects of the translation is also debated, as approximately half of the Japanese voice overs were removed to make room for the English dubbing.
