= Noriko Mitose =

Japanese singer

Noriko Mitose (みとせのりこ, Mitose Noriko, born December 3) is a Japanese singer. She is the vocalist of the band Kirche, and as a solo singer, has performed many songs for games.

== Biography ==
Noriko Mitose sang for church choir when she was young but did not get involved in the music scene until she and Toshihiko Inoue formed Kirche in 1993. She has since gone on to pursue her own singing career, and in 2005, her first solo album Yoruoto Hyouhon was released. Her following album releases, crochet and savon compile the songs she has done for games.

While many of her songs have been for adult games, she has also performed for several RPGs: Chrono Cross (she was personally requested by director Masato Kato for the ending song; she later made an album with that song's guitarist, Tomohiko Kira), Ar tonelico: Melody of Elemia, Atelier Iris 3: Grand Phantasm, Mana Khemia and Ar tonelico II: Sekai ni Hibiku Shoujotachi no Metafalica.

Apart from kirche, Mitose also provided the vocal and lyrics for ORITA, a band she formed with composer Naruki. She has also contributed to various dojin music circles, such as APPLE Project and WAVE.
