= Atelier Iris 2: The Azoth of Destiny =

2005 video game

- North American box art
- Developer: Gust Co. Ltd.
- Publishers: JP: Gust Co. Ltd.; NA: NIS America; EU: Koei; AU: THQ
- Director: Kazushige Masuda
- Producer: Tadanobu Inoue
- Designers: Kazushige Masuda; Shinichi Yoshiike; Yoshito Okamura
- Programmers: Yuji Higuchi; Teruaki Nakai; Naoya Harasawa
- Artists: Yasuhiro Nakai; Megumi Maruta; Hirokazu Nagai
- Writers: Kazushige Masuda; Shinichi Yoshiike; Yoshihiro Miyashita; Yoshijiroh Muramatsu
- Composers: Daisuke Achiwa; Ken Nakagawa
- Series: Atelier
- Platform: PlayStation 2
- Release: JP: May 26, 2005; NA: April 25, 2006; EU: September 29, 2006; AU: October 12, 2006
- Genre: Role-playing
- Mode: Single-player

Atelier Iris 2: The Azoth of Destiny, released in Japan as Atelier Iris: Eternal Mana 2 (Note: Japanese: イリスのアトリエ エターナルマナ2, Hepburn: Irisu no Atorie Etānaru Mana Tsū), is a role-playing video game developed by Japanese developer Gust Co. Ltd. for the PlayStation 2. The game is the sequel to Atelier Iris: Eternal Mana, although lore-wise is a prequel.

== Gameplay ==
The gameplay in Atelier Iris 2 is an improvement over its predecessor in many aspects. The game is unique in having two playable, switchable characters: Felt and Viese. A large portion of the game is played using Felt, who focuses on exploration and combat. Viese meanwhile, can perform Synthesis to create items and plays more of a support role. Switching between the two is essential to progression and can be done at any save point. Characters can travel to different regions and towns on the over-world map and enter them for field exploration.

Combat is turn based with a Time Gauge keeping track of player and enemy turns, with the Speed stat determining the order. Up to three active characters can be used in battle at a time with the ability to swap them with reserve members. In battle, the player characters can Charge Attack to gain skill points, Break Attack to delay enemy turns, use various items created through alchemy, defend or flee. The skill points gained can be used to activate powerful special abilities unique to each character. Delaying enemies and pushing their turns to a certain region of the time gauge will put them in a 'break' state, where they are slowed and an attack chain can be executed by the player, offering various perks. At the end of a battle, the party gains experience points and ability points to level up and learn new skills, respectively.

Being the series' defining feature, Atelier Iris 2 has an item-customization and -creation scheme known as alchemy. By obtaining a recipe and the necessary ingredients, items can be synthesized. These are divided into three categories: consumables, equipment, and field items required to progress in the game. Depending on the ingredients used, various traits can be applied to items to improve their effects. While only Viese can perform synthesis at her workshop, when a consumable item is synthesized, the player is given the choice to update the item recipe. By doing so, items of the same type retroactively gain the new traits and can then be made by either character at any time, provided the player has enough Mana Elements, which are obtained through exploration and battle. The player can find new item recipes throughout the game, many of which are required to progress through the story.

In Felt's party, every character can be equipped with two accessories and two alchemy items. In addition to providing stat boosts, alchemy items also provide an additional ability when equipped. Once enough ability points have been obtained through battles, the characters master the ability and gain it permanently. Weapons cannot be changed, however they can be improved with a system similar to item synthesis.

== Plot ==
Protagonists Felt and Viese are alchemists-in-training on the floating continent of Eden, where alchemists and mana (element spirits) coexist. While Viese is a hardworking student, Felt does not take his studies seriously and dreams of exploring regions beyond the Belkhyde Gate, a sealed gateway to another world. Upon Viese's promotion to full-fledged alchemist, they visit a forest so she can make a pact with a mana. There, a massive earthquake affects Eden, causing large chunks of it to vanish and monsters to appear. Fleeing from the monsters, they discover the Azure Azoth, a legendary Excaliber-like sword said to be guardian of Eden, and Felt successfully pulls it out. He hears the voices of the Azoth and a mysterious woman telling him to journey to Altena Church in the now unsealed Belkhyde, in order to restore Eden and prevent further disaster.

Upon arrival in the new world, Felt collapses in the Tatalian desert and is found by Noin, a girl who claims to be part of the Simsilt, a rebel army fighting to liberate Belkhyde from the Silvaresta Empire. Felt and Noin rescue Max, leader of the Simsilt, from the Empire's capital city Riesevelt and move to the rebel base. While helping the rebels, Felt and Viese learn about the Share Rings, which Viese gave Felt before leaving for Belkhyde and allow their wearer to communicate and send items to another person. During his travels, Felt meets the hunter Gray, a dragon humanoid who joins him in his quest to restore Eden, and is ambushed by Fee, a girl who wants to destroy the Azoth.

En route to Altena Church, Felt finds Fee poisoned in a forest and saves her with an antidote made by Viese. It is revealed that there are two Azoths: the Azure Azoth that Felt wields and the Crimson Azoth, which the Imperial champion Chaos wields and Fee intended to destroy. Joined by Fee, the party nears their destination but are confronted by Chaos, who overpowers Felt and Fee before being forced to retreat after Gray intervenes. At Altena Church, the purpose of the Azoths, Eden, and Belkhyde is revealed and the party finds the Gardo Continental Drive, which seals Eden off from Belkhyde. Learning about workshops that stabilize Eden and suddenly stopped operating, Felt journeys to fix them and restore Eden to its original form. The party is joined by Poe, a fairy who accidentally crossed over to Belkhyde, and, back in Eden, Viese takes care of Iris, a mysterious girl who can perform alchemy without needing mana.

After restoring Eden, Felt helps the Simsilts liberate Riesvelt. Max and Fee are revealed to be siblings and heirs to the Slaith dynasty that ruled before the Empire took over. Chaos uses Exzanosis, the Crimson Azoth's ultimate art, to petrify Max before disappearing. During the celebrations, Felt leaves the party to go after Chaos alone, duelling him after finding him at the Altena Church. However, Felt is defeated and petrified by Exzanosis, and the Azure Azoth is damaged. Chaos destroys Gardo, aiming to merge the worlds together and obtain the reincarnation of Lilith, the mother of all mana.

Weeks later, a concerned Viese crosses over to Belkhyde and, with help from Gray, Fee, Noin, and Poe, reverses Exzanosis and reunites with Felt. Eden emerges in Belkhyde and Chaos heads to capture Iris, who is revealed to be Lillith's reincarnation. It is revealed that, long ago, the alchemist Palaxius created the Crimson Azoth to control Lillith in hopes of gaining power over creation and becoming a deity. His student, Elusmus, created the Azure Azoth to stop him, after which both poured their life force into their respective Azoths. Gardo was made to isolate alchemists and Lillith in Eden away from Belkhyde and prevent Palaxius from achieving his goal. Chaos, a descendant of the alchemists who stayed behind in Belkhyde, was desperate to revive his sister, but was manipulated by Palaxius into setting events in motion and capturing Lillith. Palaxius betrays Chaos and possesses his body, putting Eden and its inhabitants under the Exzanosis spell. To save Iris, the party restores the Azure Azoth and Elusmus, allowing Felt to reverse Exzanosis. Pursuing him to the Temple of Creation, the party defeats Palaxius and saves Chaos, with Elusmus sacrificing himself to destroy his foe once and for all. With Iris freed and the crisis averted, mana spreads throughout Belkhyde as everyone finds their place in the newly merged world.

== Characters ==
Similar to its predecessor, Atelier Iris 2: The Azoth of Destiny has several playable characters. Three characters can be in a battle party at once, with the player free to switch the others in and out at any time.

=== Main ===
- Felt Blanchimont (フェルト・ブランシモン): The protagonist of the game, Felt is a young alchemist who grew up in Eden alongside Viese.
- Viese Blanchimont (ヴィーゼ・ブランシモン): Felt's childhood friend, who stays behind in Eden to help from afar.
- Noin (ノイン): A young fighter, member of the Simsilt, and the first person to join Felt after rescuing him in the desert.
- Fee (フィー): A mysterious woman brought up in Altena Church, with the goal of destroying the Azoth.
- Poe (ポウ): A womanizing fairy who lives in Eden and pursues Viese along with other maidens.
- Gray (グレイ): A dragon-like former human knight, renowned for his prowess.

=== Supporting ===
- Iris (イリス): Title character of the Atelier Iris game series
- Kreuz (クロイツ): Head of the Eden Temple
- Lutanus (ルテネス): Wise Darkness Mana, who maintains the Eden Temple library
- Meila (メイラ): Green-haired girl who is a friend of Felt and Viese
- Klavia (歌姫クラウディア): Shy Sound Mana, who rarely speaks to anyone
- Yacht (ヤッケ): Noir shopkeeper with ties to Belkhyde
- Melona (メローネ): Light Mana who runs a shop next door to Viese and Felt's studio
- Coco (ココ): Clumsy Wind Mana who works in Melona's shop
- Yuveria (ユーヴェリア): Humanoid who guided Felt to Belkhyde
- Mother Eizlen (エーゼリン): Head of the Altena Church
- Chaos (ケイオス): One of the game's main antagonists and an Imperial champion
- Galahad (ガラハド): Second Imperial Champion and Noin's father
- Tolena (トレーネ): Imperial Champion
- Theodore (テオドール, Teodōru): Consul of Riesevelt and leader of the Silvaresta Occupation Forces
- Max (マックス): Leader of the Simsilt Resistance Movement and Prince of the Slaith Dynasty.
- Hagel (ハゲル): Blacksmith and key member of the Simsilt Resistance Movement
- Mitsue (ミーツェ): Catgirl merchant from Zwital Village, likes Poe
- Theresa (テレッサ): Stylist from Grand City
- The Azure Azoth (Elusmus) (深蒼のアゾット/エラスムス): Titular Azoth of Destiny and Felt's main weapon
- The Crimson Azoth (Palaxius) (真紅のアゾット/パラケルスス): The Azoth of Belkhyde, wielded by Chaos
- Rie: Chaos' sister

=== Mana ===
As in Atelier Iris, the driving forces behind the game's alchemy are the Mana spirits and Atelier Iris 2 has a greater number of Mana. The Mana and their elements are:

- Dour (木のマナ・ドゥル): Wood
- Zuvelk (金のマナ・ツヴェルク): Metal
- Uru (火のマナ・ウル): Fire
- Aroma: Aroma
- Plua (闇のマナ・プルーア): Darkness
- Diemia (岩のマナ・ディエメア): Stone
- Nymph (水のマナ・ニンフ): Water
- Silwest (空のマナ・シルウェスト): Air
- Jiptus (毒のマナ・ジフトス): Poison
- Faustus (幻のマナ・ファウスタス): Illusion
- Siren (音のマナ・サイレン): Sound
- Aion (命のマナ・アイオン): Life
- Eital (光のマナ・エイテル): Light
- Lilith (無のマナ／原初マナ・リリス): Creation; all other Mana are her descendants.

== Music ==
Its soundtrack, composed by Ken Nakagawa and Daisuke Achiwa, was released May 18, 2005 in Japan by TEAM Entertainment. The opening song is "Eternal Story" by Haruka Shimotsuki, and the ending song is "Tachidachi no Tobira" ("Door of Departure") by Mami Horie.

== Reception ==
Reception

Aggregate score
Aggregator	Score
Metacritic	68/100

Review scores
Publication	Score
Edge	6/10
Electronic Gaming Monthly	6.17/10
Eurogamer	6/10
Famitsu	33/40
Game Informer	7.5/10
GameSpot	7/10
GameZone	7.5/10
IGN	7.5/10
Official U.S. PlayStation Magazine	2.5/5
RPGamer	(Gann) 4/5 (Lee) 3/5
RPGFan	89%

The game received "average" reviews according to the review aggregation website Metacritic. In Japan, Famitsu gave it a score of 33 out of 40.
