= Yūko Ishibashi =

Japanese singer (born 1980)

- Born: April 3, 1980 (age 46); Tokyo
- Occupation: singer

Yuuko Ishibashi (石橋優子, Ishibashi Yūko) is a Japanese singer, born April 3, 1980, in Tokyo, with a four octave vocal range. She is most well known for her vocal performances in Gust-produced video games such as the Ar tonelico series and Atelier Iris 3: Grand Phantasm. She has also performed in various Japanese television advertisements and events, theater, and children's programmes. Her debut album Haruka naru Toki no Utagoe was released January 2008.

She is the younger sister of Chie Ishibashi, better known as Chie Sawaguchi.

== Discography ==
=== Commercial albums ===
- 悠かなる刻の詩声 / Haruka naru Toki no Utagoe (Released January 23, 2008)
1. Prologue
2. Cielito Lindo
3. ひとひら / Hitohira
4. あなたがいれば / Anata ga Ireba
5. 大切なことば（Album Ver.）/ Taisetsuna kotoba (Album Ver.)
6. River～行雲流水～（Album Ver.） / River~Kouunryuusui~ (Album Ver.)
7. 私の翼 / Watashi no Tsubasa
8. Jewel
9. 小さな魔法 / Chiisana Mahou
10. 絆～The dramatic bond style～ / Kizuna~The dramatic bond style~
11. 星空につつまれて / Hoshizora ni Tsutsumarete

=== Video game contributions ===
- ぴゅあぴゅあ / Pyua Pyua (January 27, 2005)

- Destiny (credited as YOU-CO)
- アリガト。 / Arigato. (credited as YOU-CO)

- North Wind Complete Tracks (January 28, 2005)

- 二人の物語 / Futari no Monogatari (credited as YOU-CO)

- 星詠～ホシヨミ～ Ar tonelico Hymmnos concert Side 蒼 / Singing for the Stars ~Hoshiyomi~ Ar tonelico concert side Blue （January 25, 2006）

- York of love.
- そよかぜのうた / Soyokaze no Uta (Song of the Breeze)

- アルトネリコ OVA 封入特典CD / Ar tonelico OVA Enclosed Special CD (March 21, 2006)

- EXEC_HYMME_LUMINOUS_DEF/.

- そしてこの宇宙にきらめく君の詩 VOCAL & SOUND TRACK～STARRY WORLD～ / Soshite kono Uchuu ni Kirameku Kimi no Uta VOCAL & SOUND TRACK~STARRY WORLD~(May 25, 2006)

- 見えないチカラ / Mienai Chikara (credited as YOU-CO)

- イリスのアトリエ グランファンタズム オリジナルサウンドトラック / Atelier Iris Grand Fantasm Original Soundtrack (June 21, 2006)

- 大切なことば / Taisetsuna Kotoba

- クレア～そよかぜの約束～ -Ar tonelico hymmnos musical- / Claire~Soyokaze no Yakusoku (Promise of the Breeze)~ – Ar tonelico hymmnos musical- (August 30, 2006)

- 旅立 『EXEC_HYMME_CLOSSPHERE/.』 / Tabida (Journey) 『EXEC_HYMME_CLOSSPHERE/.』
- 誕生 『EXEC_HYMME_PLUTONIUS/.』 / Tanjou (Birth) 『EXEC_HYMME_PLUTONIUS/.』
- 約束 『そよかぜの約束』 / Yakusoku (Promise) 『Soyokaze no Yakusoku』 ("Promise of the Breeze")

- そしてこの宇宙にきらめく君の詩 VOCAL COLLECTION / Soshite kono Uchuu ni Kirameku Kimi no Uta VOCAL COLLECTION (February 22, 2007)

- 見えないチカラ（Remix ver.） / Mienai Chikara （Remix ver.） (credited as YOU-CO)
- 見えないチカラ（Game ver.） / Mienai Chikara （Game ver.） (credited as YOU-CO)

- スピカ～心が紡ぐ贈りもの～ -Ar tonelico hymmnos musical- / Spica~Kokoro ga Tsumugu Okurimono (A Heart-Weaving Present)~ – Ar tonelico hymmnos musical- (February 28, 2007)

- 謳姫『EXEC_HYMME_SOLFIRLE/.』 / Utau Hime (Songstress) 『EXEC_HYMME_SOLFIRLE/.』
- 女王『路地裏の女王』 / Joou (Queen) 『Roji Ura no Joou』 ("Queen of the Underworld")

- 澪~ミオ~Ar tonelico II Hymmnos Concert Side.蒼~ / Waterway~Mio~ Ar tonelico II Hymmnos Concert Side Blue (October 24, 2007)

- 聆紗の子守唄 / Reisha no Komoriuta (Reisha's Lullaby)
- 永久に結ひて / Towa ni Musuhite (Eternally Bonded)
- EXEC_HIBERNATION/.
- 絆～KIZNA / Bonds~KIZNA

=== Other ===
- Lip on Hip CompilationCD Vol.2 (January 1, 2001)

- WAX AND WANE～永遠に～優子Ver.～ / WAX AND WANE~Eien ni~Yuuko Ver.~

- 燕のいる駅/その鉄塔に男たちはいるという / Tsubame no iru Eki/Sono Tettou ni Otokotachi wa Irutoiu (May 31, 2001)

- 赤花 / Aka Hana

- Lip on Hip Compilation CD Vol.3 (December 29, 2006)

- River ～行雲流水～ / River ~Kouunryuusui~

- ディエスイレ～Also sprach Zarathustra～ドラマCD ヴェーアヴォルフ / Diesirae ～Also sprach Zarathustra～ DramaCD Wehrwolf (December 29, 2006)

- Shade And Darkness

- BELOVED LIVE 320 満開の桜の樹の下で (October 1, 2007)

- オープニングSE / Opening SE
- 観念論的錯誤 / Kannenron Teki Sakugo
- 予感－きみの好きな雨の日－ / Yokan-Kimi no Sukina Ami no Hi-
- あなたがすべて / Anata ga Subete
- たったそれだけ / Tatta Soredake
- 有罪 / Yuuzai
- 口説いて・・ / Kudoite..
- ひとつひとつ / Hitotsu Hitotsu
- 愛になりたい / Ai ni Naritai
- HELLO HELLO

- CHARMS (October 5, 2007)

- Rainbow drops
- エデン / Eden
- SERENITY~巡る想い~ / SERENITY~Meguru Omoi~
