= Haruka Shimotsuki =

Japanese singer and dōjin music composer (born 1980)

- Born: November 15, 1980 (age 45)
- Origin: Japan
- Genres: J-pop, folk rock
- Occupations: Singer, songwriter, composer
- Years active: 1999–present
- Website: shimotsukin.com

Haruka Shimotsuki (霜月はるか, Shimotsuki Haruka; born November 15, 1980) is a Japanese singer and dōjin music composer known for her vocal themes in the Atelier Iris and Ar tonelico series. She also wrote the lyrics and sang the ending themes to the first two seasons of Rozen Maiden as well as the OVA under the name Kukui, with Myu. Shimotsuki's original music mainly consists of ethnic and fantasy music, and most of her songs are soft in tone.

== Career ==
Haruka Shimotsuki started her career in 1999 beginning with singing main themes for games, and writing and composing songs. She started releasing her dōjin music under the names Maple Leaf and tieLeaf; tieLeaf is a collaborative circle with Ao Sorano and Nao Hiyama. The group has a seventy-two-page dōjinshi, one CD entitled Tsukioi no Toshi (also called Leozet Lag Ecliss in its own original language, the Lag-Quara language), a manga and novel text story book that was twenty-eight pages, and a single CD with the same name as the book, Lip-Aura, a side-story of Tsukioi no Toshi. Another project by tieLeaf, an adventure titled Neji Maku Tsuki, serves as a tie-in to Tsukioi no Toshi.

She gained attention after singing the ending theme "Tōmei Shelter" for Rozen Maiden under the name Refio+Shimotsuki Haruka. After singing "Tōmei Shelter", she and Myu (a member of Refio) formed the band Kukui. Shimotsuki has also formed a group with Rekka Katakiri and Chata many times, and they have been good friends for a long time. As an independent singer, she was once a supporting member of Sound Horizon, and made an appearance as a guest singer in their 2006 concert. She took a more major role in Sound Horizon's album Moira and performed in the corresponding live concerts in 2008 and 2009. Haruka Shimotsuki held a solo concert, Tokeidai no Aru Machi yori (時計台のある街より): Haruka Shimotsuki Solo Live Lv.1 on August 10, 2006. Her second solo concert, Haruka Shimotsuki solo live Lv.2: Shimotsuki Haruka wa Level ga 1 Agatta (シモツキンはレベルが1あがった), was held on July 13, 2008.

Besides singing, composing and writing the lyrics for the opening and ending themes for the PC visual novel Relict: Toki no Wasuremono, she also composed about seven background music tracks for the game. Wind and string instruments are heavily used for the tracks, and she was able to exhibit her talent in ethnic music. This was her first time in composing songs for a game, and her feelings at that time were recorded in the booklet attached to the Image Soundtrack of the game. In the PlayStation 2 game Ar tonelico: Melody of Elemia, she composed and performed the songs of one of the heroines, Aurica Nestmille, and took part in singing the ending theme "EXEC_PHANTASMAGORIA/.". She later took part in the sequel Ar tonelico II Sekai ni Hibiku Shōjo-tachi no Metafalica as the singing voice of one of the heroines, Luca Truelywaath, and took part in the ending song "EXEC_with.METHOD_METAFALICA/.".

In November 2009, she had another concert, Haruka Shimotsuki Original Fantasy Concert 2009 -FEL ARY ARIA-, was held at NIPPON SEINEN-KAN HALL featuring all her songs from Tindharia no Tane and a select few from Griotte no Nemurihime. It was later released on DVD on February 24, 2010.

== Discography ==
=== Dōjin albums ===
- Ciel Etoile (BGM arrange album for Key's Air) (October 2001)
- Sacred Doors Vol.1 (October 2001)
- Reed+ (BGM arrange album for the MMORPG Ragnarok Online) (October 2002)
- Yuragu Sora (ユラグソラ) (December 30, 2002)
- Impronta/Eien no Toshi e (永遠の都市へ) (October 19, 2003)
- Tsukioi no Toshi (月追いの都市) (Under the name tieLeaf) (December 30, 2005)
- Maple Leaf Box (December 29, 2006)
- Lip Aura (Tsukioi no Toshi side-story) (August 17, 2007)
- Wyrdrad no Shirabe (ウィルド・ラッドの調べ): Sacred Doors Another Tale (August 16, 2008)
- Hikari no Amaoto ~SACRED DOORS element maxi side Undine~ (光の雨音～SACRED DOORS element maxi side Undine～) (August 15, 2010)
- Tsunagi Chō no Tsuka (ツナギ蝶ノ塚) - with arcane753 circle composed of Manyo (composition/arrangement), Nao Hiyama (lyrics) and Shimotsuki (vocals) (December 29, 2010)
- Hane no Naki Chō (羽ノ亡キ蝶) - with arcane753 circle (with Marie as guest vocalist) (August 13, 2011)
- Chō no Arika (蝶ノ在リ処) - with arcane753 circle (with Marie as guest vocalist) (August 11, 2012)

=== Commercial singles ===
- "Garasu Kagami no Yume" (硝子鏡の夢) (PS2 version Princess Maker 4 theme song; released October 26, 2005)
- "Kiri no Mukō ni Tsunagaru Sekai" (霧の向こうに繋がる世界) (Collaboration single with Revo of Sound Horizon; released June 14, 2006)
- "Hoshizora no Sakamichi" (星空の坂道) (Released September 26, 2007)
- "Kazahane" (カザハネ) (TV anime H_{2}O: Footprints in the Sand ending theme and insert song; released February 22, 2008)
- "break time" (Web radio program Frost Moon Cafe opening and ending theme; released April 8, 2009)
- "Kimi tono Tabiji" (君との旅路) (PSP game Dice Dice Fantasia theme song; released December 23, 2009)
- "Saigo no Michishirube" (最後の道標) (PS3 game Last Rebellion ending song; released February 10, 2010)
- "smile link" (Frost Moon Cafe+ opening and ending theme; released June 1, 2011)

=== Commercial albums ===
- Ashiato Rhythm (あしあとリズム) (Released September 22, 2005) (Compilation album)
- Tindharia no Tane (ティンダーリアの種) (Released February 28, 2007)
- Oto no Compass (音のコンパス) (Released June 25, 2008) (Compilation album)
- Griotte no Nemuri Hime (グリオットの眠り姫) (Released October 14, 2009) (an album in the Tindharia universe)
- Michibiki no Harmony (導きのハーモニー) (Released April 14, 2010) (Compilation album)
- Innocent Grey Haruka Shimotsuki Collection (Released January 14, 2011)
- Hoshizora Ensemble (星空アンサンブル) (Released February 23, 2011)
- Koboreru Suna no Aria (零れる砂のアリア) (Released April 25, 2012) (an album in the Tindharia universe)
- Tindharia no Kanade (ティンダーリアの奏) (Released June 30, 2012) (an album in the Tindharia universe)
- Omoi no Koncheruto (想いのコンチェルト) (Released November 14, 2012)

=== Other works ===
==== Anime ====
- Kakera Musubi (かけらむすび) (September 27, 2006)
- Nishi no yoki Majo (opening)

==== Games ====
- Akai Ito Original Soundtrack (November 3, 2004)
- Saishū Shiken Kujira (最終試験くじら): Progressive Memories (December 1, 2004)
- Taito no Suika (Music video game Beatmania IIDX 10 th Style CS) (2004)
- Atelier Series Vocal Collection: Volkslied (アトリエシリーズ・ボーカルコレクション～フォルクスリート～) (April 20, 2005)
- Atelier Iris ~Eternal Mana 2~ Original Soundtrack (May 18, 2005)
- Cartagra Soundtrack (カルタグラ サウンドトラック): Manie (August 19, 2005)
- Atelier Iris ~Eternal Mana 2~ Original Drama Vol. 2 (October 5, 2005)
- Ar tonelico Hymmnos concert side Crimson Tsuki Kanade: Tsuki Kanade (January 25, 2006)
- Lost Child Original Soundtrack Infinia (Lost Child オリジナルサウンドトラック 「インフィニア」) (Under the name MW, a duet with Rekka Katakiri; released January 27, 2006)
- Ar tonelico OVA Enclosed Special CD (アルトネリコ OVA 封入特典CD) (March 21, 2006)
- Atelier Iris Grand Fantasm Original Soundtrack (イリスのアトリエ グランファンタズム オリジナルサウンドトラック) (June 21, 2006)
- Claire: Soyokaze no Yakusoku (クレア～そよかぜの約束～): Ar tonelico Hymmnos Musical (August 30, 2006)
- Spica: Kokoro ga Tsumugu Okurimono (スピカ～心が紡ぐ贈りもの～): Ar tonelico Hymmnos Musical (February 28, 2007)
- Mana-Khemia: Gakuen no Renkinjutsushitachi Original Soundtrack (マナケミア ～学園の錬金術士たち～ Original Soundtrack) (May 5, 2007)
- Atelier Series & Mana-Khemia Vocal Collection: Volkslied 2 (アトリエシリーズ&マナケミア・ボーカルコレクション～フォルクスリート2～) (May 30, 2007)
- Ar tonelico II: Sekai ni Hibiku Shoujotachi no Metafalica Original Soundtrack (アルトネリコ2 世界に響く少女たちの創造詩 オリジナルサウンドトラック) (October 10, 2007)
- Homura: Homura Ar tonelico II Hymmnos Concert Side Crimson (焔～ホムラ アルトネリコ2ヒュムノスコンサート サイド 紅) (October 24, 2007)
- Clear
- Itsuka, Todoku, Ano Sora ni. (いつか、届く、あの空に。): Visitor of Another Air
- Sacrament (サクラメント)
- Shōnentachi no Byōtō (少年達の病棟) Full Voice Edition
- Gyakuten Saiban Tokubetsu Hōtei 2008 Orchestra Concert: Gyakuten Meets Orchestra Exhibition Souvenir (逆転裁判 特別法廷2008 オーケストラコンサート ~Gyakuten Meets Orchestra~ 開催記念品) (April 20, 2008)
- Kara no Shōjo (殻ノ少女) (July 4, 2008)
- Aoishiro Original Soundtrack (アオイシロオリジナルサウンドトラック) (August 15, 2008)
- Suzunomiya～SUZUNO MIYA Ar Tonelico III hymmnos concert side Crimson～ (珠洲ノ宮～SUZUNO MIYA アルトネリコ3ヒュムノスコンサート サイド 紅～) (January 27, 2010)
- Ar tonelico Hymmnos Musical - Cocona ~Two Feelings, Two Songs~ (アルトネリコ ヒュムノス ミュージカル ココナ ～二つの想い 二つの詩～) (November 10, 2010)
- Ar tonelico Hymmnos Musical Vocal Best ~Claire&Spica~ (アルトネリコ ヒュムノス ミュージカル ボーカルベスト ～クレア&スピカ～) (December 22, 2010)
- Ar tonelico Hymmnos Musical Vocal Mini Album ~Cocona~ (アルトネリコ ヒュムノス ミュージカル ボーカルミニアルバム ～ココナ～) (February 23, 2010)
- -HISTORIA- (Radiant Historia ending theme.) with composer Yoko Shimomura (November 3, 2010)
- Mugen Souls Original Soundtrack (圧倒的遊戯ムゲンソウルズ オリジナルサウンドトラック; with composer Tenpei Sato) (March 14, 2012)
- Etrian Odyssey IV: Legends of the Titan Super Arrange Version (世界樹の迷宮IV 伝承の巨神」スーパー・アレンジ・バージョン), Track 3 (September 5, 2012)
- Element of SPADA (Music video game Beatmania IIDX 21 SPADA) (2013)
- Kurobeni Sukui (Music video game Reflec Beat Yūkyū no Reflesia (Reflec Beat 悠久のリフレシア)) (2016)
- FestivaLight (Music video game maimai MiLK PLUS) (2018)
- Monster Boy and the Cursed Kingdom (2018)
- Cross Edge (2008)
- Trinity Universe (2009)
- Étoile (Japanese ver.) (Mobile game MementoMori) (2022)
- Napoleon Maiden ~A maiden without the word impossible~ (January 27, 2023)

==== Dōjin ====
- Eden no Wakaremichi (エデンの分かれ道)

==== Drama CDs ====
- Tindharia no Tane Drama CD (ティンダーリアの種ドラマCD) (May 28, 2008)
- Soundstory The Girl of the Flower of Emotions ~Lip Aura~ Prelude (サウンドストーリー 花想少女～Lip-Aura （リプアラ）～ 前奏曲 (プレリュード)) (August 15, 2010) - with Annabel
- Tindharia no Tane Gaiden ~Sorezore no Hanamatsuri~ (ティンダーリアの種 外伝 ～それぞれの花祭り～) (August 15, 2010)

=== Cover songs ===
- "Englishman in New York" (on the album SoulS)

=== With Barbarian on the Groove ===
- Taos Pueblo (album)
- Le Monde Musical De (album)
- Dragon Valley
- Dragon Valley ~Arco Iris~
- Dragon Valley ~Twilight~
