= Ar Tonelico =

- Genre: Role-playing game
- Developers: Gust Co. Ltd. Banpresto
- Publishers: Banpresto; NIS America; 505 Games; Bandai Namco Entertainment
- Creator: Akira Tsuchiya
- Platforms: PlayStation 2, PlayStation 3
- First release: Ar tonelico: Melody of Elemia; January 26, 2006
- Latest release: Ar tonelico Qoga: Knell of Ar Ciel; January 28, 2010

Ar tonelico (Note: Japanese: アルトネリコ, Hepburn: arutoneriko) is a multimedia project series made in collaboration by Gust Corporation and Banpresto (currently subsidiaries of Tecmo Koei and Namco Bandai Games respectively) consisting of video games, manga, and an OVA. The name of the series is also the name of the amplification complex composed by three monumental towers that appear in the aforementioned works. Throughout the life of the series, it was directed by Akira Tsuchiya (Gust) and produced by Atsunori Kawachi (Banpresto). The main theme songs for all of the games were sung by Akiko Shikata. Recently, it was succeeded by the Surge Concerto series.

== Games ==
The core part of the series is formed by three console role playing games, which are listed below in chronological order:

1. Ar tonelico: Melody of Elemia
2. Ar tonelico II: Melody of Metafalica
3. Ar tonelico Qoga: Knell of Ar Ciel

== Summary ==
The Ar tonelico series is set in a planet called Ar Ciel, which lost its land in a great man-made catastrophe a long time ago, and it is a work of science fantasy that depicts the interaction between the protagonist and the heroines, the latter generally being members of a race called Revatail (romanized as Reyvateil in the English-localized versions of the games and related material), which can use a special ability known as Song Magic. During the course of the trilogy of games, the people were forced to live on three gigantic structures they made after the land was lost, and due to the loss of communication between the regions that form Ar Ciel, the people eventually came to believe that the region where they lived was the entirety of the "world" that existed.

A constructed language known as the Hymmnos Language (called Hymnos in English-language releases) is also present throughout the materials that form the series, used as part of the dialogue in the games as well as part of the lyrics of the songs heard in most audio releases related to the series, and used as a decorative element in parts of the interface, visual effects and backgrounds. The meaning to these multiple messages isn't apparent in the works themselves, but the Hymmnos language has a detailed vocabulary and set of grammar rules that can be read in detail over at the official site, which can be used as a guide to translate all phrases written in said language to Japanese. And while it hasn't received an official translation, all of this information has been translated for English-speaking audiences by fans of the series. Therefore, the players can discover hidden meanings and the feelings the characters singing the songs have hidden in its lyrics upon translating them.

The first chapter in the series, released as a game for the Sony PlayStation 2, gathered quite an appreciation due to its depictions of several topics, beginning with the usage of the Hymmnos Language for its songs, followed by the union of an elaborate world setting with a charming cast of characters. The following games introduced new ideas to the formula while continuing with the established basis for the series, as well as also receiving expansions into multimedia territory with the release of material such as manga and Drama CDs, which having songs and music as their core, further expanded the already complex world setting. Therefore, several products such as CDs compiling the songs found in the games and books explaining the intricacies of the game's world were released.

=== Development ===
The setting for the first game, Sol Ciel, has its basis on the world setting that series' director Akira Tsuchiya created and used in 1995, during his college days, for a tabletop role-playing game, which also was where characters such as Shurelia were originally established and created. Ar tonelico was originally planned to be developed as an RPG that would see release in the PlayStation 2 console back in 2000, but the development was interrupted under the pretext that the "system for creating magical effects based on synthesizing bels" gave too much freedom to the player and thus, increased the difficult beyond tolerable levels. However, the project was restarted later on as a collaboration with Banpresto, in which the aforementioned bels were simplified with the introduction of the synthesis recipes, and the main concepts to the series: "Grathmeld", "Reyvateil", "Cosmosphere" and "Hymmnos", were introduced. Finally, after a development process in which there were several problems with the writing and revision of the main scenario scripts, the first game: Ar tonelico: Melody of Elemia, saw release in January 2006 at Japan, which would be localized for North America by NIS America the following year.

That same year, in October, the second game in the series: Ar tonelico II: Melody of Metafalica, was released as a PlayStation 2 RPG, and while a few characters returned for this sequel, it depicted a different region in the same planet as the first game, but a couple years after it ended. Like the first game, it was localized by NIS America in January 2009. The third and final installment in the series was released in January 2010 as a PlayStation 3 RPG titled Ar tonelico Qoga: Knell of Ar Ciel, and similarly to the second game, it depicted a different region a few years after its ending, but it also served as the conclusion for the storyline that started with the first game.

=== Systems ===
The games introduce the usage of Song Magic in battle that has become unique to the Ar tonelico series, and even though the depiction of its usage varies greatly from a game to other, it has a few common elements throughout the series: the party is composed by Vanguards and heroines, and the Vanguards must protect the heroines as they sing their Song Magic and until they can activate it, as Song Magic displays stronger effects the longer the heroines sing it. Additionally, there are times when either ally or enemy Reyvateils will be singing Hymmnos songs, which will become the BGM for that particular battle, demonstrating the importance the Songs have in this series.

Additionally, the games have systems that are similar to the "Alchemical Synthesis" that has a central role in Gust's famous Atelier series games: "Grathmelding" and "Synthesis", which allow the players to create a large variety of items.

=== Girl Synthesis RPG ===
The company itself has formally defined the game's genre as a "Girl Synthesis RPG". This refers to the world hidden inside the Reyvateils' mind called the Cosmosphere (also called the Soulspace), as well as the fact that the player can earn costumes with specific themes, such as Angels, Shrine maidens and Witches; and have the Reyvateils wear them.

== World Setting ==
While the three games have their stories set in different places and have different characters, they fundamentally share the same world. The world of Ar tonelico: Melody of Elemia, Sol Ciel, is formed by an enormous Tower called "Ar tonelico" and a floating continent called the "Wings of Horus", while the world of Ar tonelico II: Melody of Metafalica, "Metafalss", is a harsh world formed by a small tower surrounded by an artificial land called the "Rim", and finally, Ar tonelico Qoga: Knell of Ar Ciel is set in world called "Sol Cluster", in which a white tower with a unique design is surrounded by a rock formation called the "Great Fang".

=== The Universe of EXA_PICO ===
The universe that serves as the setting for the Ar tonelico series differs from our own in that it was formed by the Song interwoven out of waves by the original atomic nucleus called EXA_PICO. Therefore, this universe is structured in a form in which the planets, continents and life forms, all are created from the waves produced by the songs sung by higher-order life forms, and regardless of their position in the cosmic hierarchy, every life form sings out the waves that compose itself, allowing it to exert influence over life forms of a lower order than itself. EXA_PICO emits a countless number of wave types, of which the planetary system to which Ar Ciel belongs only receives a very small number: in total, Ar Ciel is formed by approximately 20 wave types, of which only seven have a role in the formation of the humans. Similarly, all of the planets that belong to the universe of EXA_PICO are formed by the waves emitted by the central stars and star clusters of which they are part, so the waves that compose their existence are structured in different ways and therefore, the people, flora and fauna found in them are formed by differing wave types.

Below is a representation of how the relationships work in the cosmic hierarchy using only nine of EXA_PICO's wave types as an example.

The Waves of EXA_PICO (partial excerpt)
*	R-Waves	N-Waves	Tz-Waves	D-Waves	V-Waves	Vx-Waves	K-Waves	H-Waves	S-Waves
The Universe of EXA_PICO	○	○	○	○	○	○	○	○	○
Ar Ciel's Star Cluster	×	○	○	○	○	○	×	○	○
Ar Ciel's Sun (Sol)	×	×	○	○	○	○	×	○	×
Planet Ar Ciel	×	×	×	○	○	○	×	○	×
Hymmnos	×	×	×	○	×	×	×	○	×

=== Ar Ciel ===
The planet that serves as the setting for the series. Its name means "The only world" in Hymmnos Language. It also receives the name "Sol Ciel" in the Ancient Metafalss Note dialect of the Hymmnos Language, which translates to "shining world". As the result of the great disaster known as the "Grathnode Inferia", the sky was covered with a layer of plasma called the "Blast Line", while the surface of the planet was pulverized and covered by a thick layer of clouds called the "Sea of Death", so the survivors to this catastrophe barely managed to escape death by clinging to the Towers and their surrounding areas, which became the only places where life could still thrive in Ar Ciel. This planet is orbited by two natural satellites known as the "Cello Moon" and the "Viola Moon", with the "Cello Moon" being large and purple while the "Viola Moon" is small and golden. In Sol Ciel, these moons are visible in the sky at alternating intervals, while in other regions they are visible at the same time during certain occasions.

Additionally, while Ar Ciel was established as the name for the planet in the second game, an item called the "Ar Ciel Globe" made an appearance in the "Supporteil" mini-game before Ar tonelico II was released, which is described as a globe map for Ar Ciel.

=== Ar Cielan Gods (Wills of the Planet and others) ===
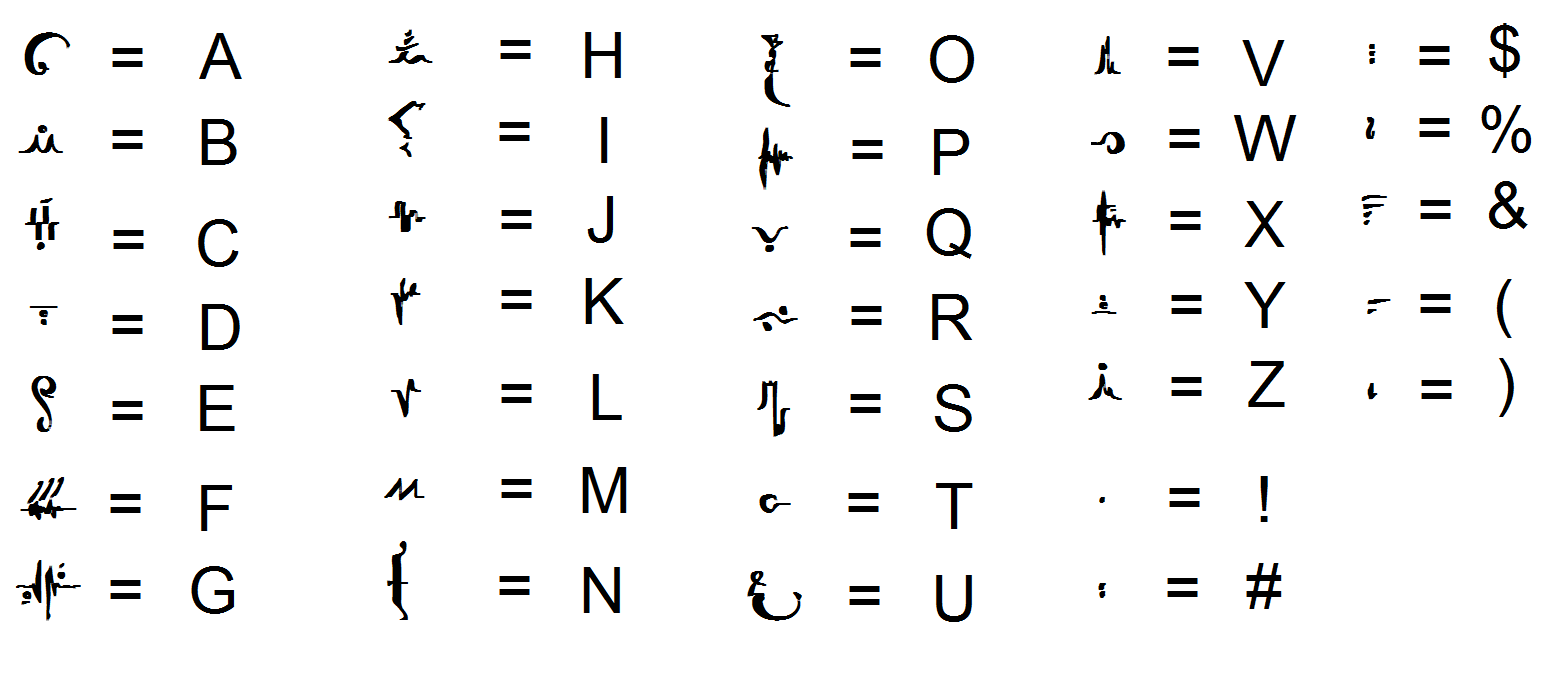
Ar-Cielan Glyph

There are two main types of Gods in Ar Ciel: one is the "Wills of the Planet" that created the entirety of Ar Ciel from the Planetary Core where they reside, and the second are the "Reyvateil Origins" that are mentioned later on the article.

The term "Wills of the Planet" refers to the souls that compose Planet Ar Ciel, as well as the agglomeration of said souls. The first Wills are called the "Wills of Origin", as they are the three original Wills that created Ar Ciel: "Juklizda", "Clyuue" and "Horus", and the other Wills were derived from them as they were needed for the structuring of the Planet. A countless number of Wills of the Planet exist in Ar Ciel, but at the current point in time in which the games take place: the Third Era, several of them have faded away, but their number is roughly equal to that of the humans that still live on it.

The Wills of the Planet are also called the "Children of the Planet", and while normally they don't have a physical form, in extremely rare occasions they can manifest themselves in a physical form through several methods such as "materialization", "possession" and "reincarnation". It is due to these appearances and the great power they wield that the humans and Teru have come to recognize them as "Gods".

While the way the humans regard the Wills of the Planet varies from a region to other, the typical way in which they view them is as "beings that should feared and revered due to their great power", which is especially true in the region of Sol Cluster due to how strongly they revered the Gods. On the other hand, the Teru regard the Wills of the Planet as "friends from a nearby world" due to their higher sensibility and the multiple times they have been able to establish contact with them; especially in the region of "Syestine", which is considered as the holy ground of the Teru and the place where the Third Tower of Ar tonelico was built many years later. This region was a treasure trove of Songstones, as well as the point where it was the easiest to contact the Wills of the Planet, which led to it being called the "place where the truth of the world is gathered".

Furthermore, the twelve major Wills of the Planet receive the name of "The Twelve Gods of Starcircling" in Ar Ciel's mythology. And while it may be a bit out of the topic at hand, the Wills that give form to the star cluster and solar system to which Ar Ciel belongs are beings of a much higher order, of which the Wills of the Planet recognize Sol (the Will of Ar Ciel's Sun) as their main God.

Summary of the Wills of the Planet
Lineage	Name of the God	Mythological Role	Real Role	Direct Superior (Parent?)
Land	Horus	Wasn't discovered until 2930 AD, so it doesn't appear in any myths. Highest level God of the Land lineage.	Complete ruling over the physical structure (all D-Wave related matters) of Ar Ciel.	None
Sky	Nayudara/Juklizda	Sun God; Highest level God of the Sky lineage.	Light, radiation, preservation of the stratosphere.	None
Souls	Rokkan/Clyuue	King of kings, lord of the gods Highest level God of the Souls lineage	Core of the wills, controller of U-Waves.	None
Sky	Soutentei/Soreile	God of the skies and wind	Weather control, atmospheric maintenance	Juklizda
Sky	Deiji/Dijya	God of mountains and volcanoes	Controls matter convection, minerals and such other matters related to Ar Ciel's soil	Soreile
Sky	Soumanomiya/Soma	God of violence and catastrophes	Balance through natural selection, maintenance of the world	Soreile
Sky	Kokura/Filament	God of death and poverty	Overseer of balance for world preservation	Soma
Souls	Suzunomiya/Hymmnosphere	God of song and creation	Mother of the tridimensional world, controller of D-waves	Clyuue
Souls	Koudeinomikoto/Listea	God of weapons and battle	Control of H-Wave interference, mediation, natural selection	Hymmnosphere
Souls	Sashanomiya/Sasya	God of civilization and knowledge	Overseer of D-waves and material order	Hymmnosphere
Souls	Datenkou/Salapator	Goddess of love, god of downfall	H-wave interference, harmony, resonance direction	Hymmnosphere
Land	Reishiki/Lere	God of souls and the material world. (Was thought to be the highest level God of the Land lineage)	Primary god of life creation, controller of H-Waves	Horus
Land	Saranoyomei/Shelanoir	God of plants, forests, and life	Plant-centric god of creation	Lere
Land	Sakiyarumei/Saki	God of salvation and life	Animal-centric god of creation	Lere
Land	Gurentei/Yurishica	God of fire and civilization	Revelation and encouragement of human advancement	Saki
Land	Ar Ru (Arru) (Note: While in the end "Ar Ru" isn't more than a couple of Hymmnos words used to designate her role as the Antibody Brain, as that has been established to be her proper name, Tilia gave to her the nickname "Arru")	None due to being discovered long after the First Era had ended	Creation and control of the Antibodies. Antibody Brain	Horus

Additionally, there are "Demigods" aside of the normal Wills of the Planet, which serve as intermediaries between the Wills and the humans. It has even been theorized that the first humans had Demigods as one or both parents, therefore making the Demigods born during the Era of Origin the parents of all humankind.

The Demigods descended upon the surface with the mission of leading the people down in a specific direction, and while there situations in which they came into the world with full knowledge of their mission, in others they would forget about it completely as well as their status as Demigods upon being born into the human world and would suddenly remember it in a certain day. The latter case was what happened to Raikokubishi in the story "The Chronicles of Resshikou ~Emperor of Wailing Thunder~", which was usually the starting point for a tragedy.

Finally, the ending of the trials endured by the saintly woman Rhaplanca that was featured so prominently in the myths of Metafalss was published in the Apocryphal Booklet of the compilation "Kurt Hymneth ~The Songs that Conversed with the Gods~", and while she hadn't been considered as a "God" up to that point, she is described as one at the end of said story. However, there are no details on if she became a proper Will of the Planet (God) or a Demigoddess.

Summary of the Demigods
Lineage	Name of the Demigod	Additional Notes	Direct Superior God (Parent?)
Sky	Shiraku/Shirak	Unknown	Soreile
Sky	Risshidou/Myu	Appears in the myths of Harvestasha. Salapator fell in love with him.	Dijya
Souls	Raikokubishi/Syerek	The main character of "The Chronicles of Resshikou ~Emperor of Wailing Thunder~"; Greatly suffered between his mission as a Child of the Gods and the woman he loved.	Listea
Souls	Toumyounokisaki/Technoticalirsha	Unknown	Sasha
Souls	Buten/Maoh	One of the main characters in the Metafalssian mythology. In contrast to Rhaplanca, who embodies an ideal human being, he is depicted as an incomplete being that is always being worried and suffering.	Clyuue
Land	Houjoushiki/Harvestasha	The eponymous heroine of the Harvestasha legends. Fought with Salapator over Myu's love.	Lere
Unknown	Hishouten/Eoria	In mythology, she was the eldest sister of the "Trio of Elemia" and had the power to control the wind. Different person from the Reyvateil Origin that was named after her later on.	Unknown
Unknown	Hekibyouten/Frelia	In mythology, she was the middle sister of the "Trio of Elemia" and had the power to control the land. Different person from the Reyvateil Origin that was named after her later on.	Unknown
Unknown	Kaibyouten/Tyria	In mythology, she was the youngest sister of the "Trio of Elemia" and had the power to control the water. Different person from the Reyvateil Origin that was named after her later on.	Unknown

=== Ar tonelico ===
The name of the enormous structures (Towers) that serve as the setting for each individual game in the series. The name is composed by the Hymmnos Language words "Ar" (the only) and "tonelico" (divine tree), which together translate to "The Holy World Tree", and are enormous structures that were built during the times the land still existed in Ar Ciel. They go from the First to the Third Towers.

The First Tower of "Ar tonelico" is an "amplification Tower" that "supplies the people with an amplified version of the power of sounds on which Sound Science is grounded". While in the current times it has become a piece of lost technology, it still sees ample use due to its function as a "Song Magic Server", which makes it the power source for the Song Magic of the Reyvateils. Therefore, the Reyvateils in Sol Ciel all use the First Tower of Ar tonelico as their Song Server.

The "Second Tower of Ar tonelico", administrated by Frelia, was constructed to be a relay tower for the First, but due to its incomplete status, all of the Reyvateils in Metafalss, excepting for the IPDs, are instead connected to the First Tower in Sol Ciel through the Symphonic Power relay satellite "Sol Marta". On the other hand, the IPD Reyvateils use "Infel Phira" as their Song Server.

The Third Tower "Harvestasha", located in the region of Sol Cluster, was built to shoot the XP Shell into the Planetary in order to carry out the AAA Planet Regeneration Project, but due to several incidents that led it to lack the power necessary to finish its construction, it wasn't completed until near the end of the story of Ar tonelico Qoga. The Third Tower itself doesn't have the functions of a Song Server, but it isn't linked to the First Tower like the Second is. The Song Server proper that houses the Soulspaces of the Sol Cluster Reyvateils is instead stored in the "Tower of Origin" located at Archia.

Each one of the three Towers of Ar tonelico is administrated by a "Reyvateil Origin", but after the Grathnode Inferia, the people relocated themselves to the upper areas of the regions where they lived, barely escaping death, and since this isolated the Towers from each other, they eventually came to believe that the region where they lived was everything that existed around them, which is why they call each region a world. Therefore, the world around the Tower administrated by Eoria is called "Sol Ciel", the world around the Tower administrated by Frelia is called "Metafalss" and finally, the world around the Tower administrated by Tyria is called "Sol Cluster".

=== Reyvateil ===
Originally called "Revatail" in the Japanese version, which comes from the Hymmnos word with the same pronunciation and meaning, they are a rare race that has appeared in all material related to the series so far and has the ability of converting sounds into power. While they used to be an artificially created race, they are in appearance indistinguishable from the humans, and they can also interbreed with them. As the Y-Chromosome impedes the manifestation of Reyvateil qualities, there are only female Reyvateils. The proof of being a Reyvateil is a mark called the "Install Port" appearing in some part of their bodies. As they can control a miraculous power called "Song Magic", they are said to be capable of "talking with the world". Every Reyvateil is connected to the Song Server they use as the source of their powers through an umbilical cord of sorts located in the deepest layer of their psyches. The Song Magic they sing isn't really related to the processes in their mouth and throats that produce their normal voices, but it is instead produced by the Song Server causing the waves in the air to vibrate, producing sounds, instruments and voices to form a song identical to the one the Reyvateil has in her mind. (Note: There are differences between the Song Magic Servers located in each region. For more details, please refer to the #Ar tonelico section.)

The Reyvateils are subdivided into the following general types: the special "Reyvateil Origins", the pure "Pureblooded β-types", and the human halfbreeds "Third Generations". The IPDs unique to Metafalss also belong to the "Third Generation" category. Additionally, the Archia Think Tank over at Sol Cluster created a unique type known as the "γ-Sublimed". This type has the peculiarity of having a total of 24 Soulspace strata, in comparison to the other Reyvateil types which only have nine. (Note: However, the Divers can only reach up to the ninth stratum in normal Dives.)

==== Reyvateil Origins ====
Special Reyvateils created to be the Administrators of the Towers. There are only three of them, which in order of oldest to younger are: "Eoria", "Frelia" and "Tyria". All of them were born in El Elemia (the main country of Sol Ciel) during the First Era, and their abilities as Reyvateils surpass that of most of the other types by far. They all have their Install Ports located in the same place: on their hips. As completely artificial life forms, they only grew until they turned 18, and won't ever age or die. Eoria is the oldest living Reyvateil, who was 739 years old at the time the events of Ar tonelico 1 took place. (Note: And while she says in the game that she has lived far longer than that, in the "Corner for Enthusiasts" section of one of the columns in the official site Toukousphere Issue #13, she explicitly said it was a misunderstanding.) As the general concept of the Cosmospheres wasn't yet invented by the time they were created, they differ from the Pureblooded β-types and Third Generations in the fact that they don't have a Cosmosphere (excepting for Frelia).

Their names are taken from the three Demigoddesses known as the "Trio of Elemia" that appear in the Ar Ciel creation myth "Stelliarhythm", of which Eoria had the power of controlling the "wind", Frelia the "land" and Tyria the "water". Their Cluster (Japanese) styled names are as follows: "Eoria = Hishouten", "Frelia = Hekibyouten" and "Tyria = Kaibyouten".

Therefore, they alongside the Demigoddesses from which their names are taken are the main target of worshiping for the people of Sol Ciel, called the "Trio of Elemia".

However, Frelia has lost her status as a Goddess in Metafalss, while in Sol Cluster the Reyvateil Origins aren't recognized as divine beings either in the Great Fang or Archia, though the Reyvateil country of Clustania does worship Tyria, but more as a queen and the person who founded the country than as a Goddess.

==== Pureblooded β-Types ====
In a loose way of speaking, Clones of the Reyvateil Origins. They will have the same eternal youth as the Origins, yet they aren't immortal, as they have a life span of roughly 150 years. However, they do have in common with the Origins that they are genetically programmed to stop aging once they reach 18 years of age, so once they reach that point, they won't grow or age anymore, and will keep the figure they have at that age until their deaths. There is also a Pureblooded β-Type called Mir that was created around 400 years ago and is still alive, but as she was sealed away when she was around 30 years old, she hasn't technically surpassed her life limit yet. The Pureblooded β-types that currently exist in the world of Sol Ciel are only Misha and the sealed away Mir, as well as a few who are currently living in the city of Platina. In the world of Metafalss, Frelia didn't do what Eoria did and thus didn't pass on to anyone the techniques and technology necessary for their creation, so they have become like legendary existences in that region. However, all of the Third Generations that currently live there are descendants of the Pureblooded β-Types that moved there from Sol Ciel during the First and Second Eras. As for the world of Sol Cluster, both Archia and Clustania have preserved the techniques and technology for creating Pureblooded β-Types. However, at the Reyvateil-centric country of Clustania, the birth of Reyvateils is regulated so only a specific number of them are produced each year.

Incidentally, the heart of the Reyvateils, called the Triangular Nuclear Loop, has an energy source called Telomeres, which is equivalent to the telomeres present in the human chromosomes, and they also indicate for how long the Triangular Nuclear Loop can work, serving as that which indicates the life span of the Reyvateils. Theoretically it is possible to replenish Telomeres to a Triangular Nuclear Loop, but such method fundamentally doesn't exist. However, the Rinkernator of the Third Tower of Ar tonelico is equipped with machines that allow to donate a large amount of Telomeres from a Reyvateil to other, making it possible to restore them to a depleted Triangular Nuclear Loop. As for the Rinkernator in the First Tower, as the ways they keep themselves alive differ so much between the Administrators of these two Towers (Eoria and Tyria), it most likely isn't equipped with such machinery. When a Pureblooded β-type reaches the end of her life, or if she is taken beyond the range of the Tower to which she is connected, the Triangular Nuclear Loop will shut itself down and her body will turn back into the physiological saline solution that was used to create her, so they will disappear without even leaving behind a corpse. This is common to both the Pureblooded β-Types and the Origins.

==== Third Generations ====
Girls that are born human but have Reyvateil abilities awakening at a later point in their life, which are always the result of the union between a human and a Reyvateil, and have a rather relative low probability of awakening. Strictly speaking, since they are just humans that were erroneously recognized as Reyvateils by the Song Servers due to their strong Reyvateil factors, they typically are inferior to the Pureblooded β-Types due to the enormous difference in ability between each girl, which is why they are given a test called the Hexagonal Plate Test and from its results, they are assigned a rank that goes from A to D in Sol Ciel. Unlike the Reyvateil Origins and the Pureblooded β-Types, they grow and age in the same way humans do. As the Reyvateils abilities begin devouring their human life force after they awaken, they have extremely short life spans, thus requiring to have administered at fixed intervals a life extending agent called "Diquility" in order to prolong their lives. Without Diquility, the most they can live is around 20 years. Either way, even if they receive their needed Diquility doses, the most a Third Generation Reyvateil will live is around 40 years. (Note: However, the typical human life expectancy over at Ar Ciel is between 40 and 50 years. And since life expectancy statistics are given meaning by even including the death rate for newborn babies, humans and Third Generation Reyvateils have the same average life span, so it doesn't change the way they live in the slightest.)

Reyvateil factors are inherited from parents to children, so there are normal humans that have Reyvateil blood in their genealogy, and in the case of males, they can have strong Reyvateil factors yet they will never manifest them, while there are also potential Reyvateil women that carry the factors but don't manifest them. For example, the protagonist of the first game, Lyner, had an extremely high probability of awakening as a Third Generation Reyvateil if he had been born female due to the strength of the Reyvateil factors he carries. However, there is an exception to this, as in the Sol Cluster region, the Neo Atlas Faction of Archia scattered several anomalous Reyvateil factors in preparation for the execution of their "Human Evolution Project", which fundamentally allows anyone to connect their minds to a Song Server regardless of gender or Reyvateil awakening, yet if these humans suffer a strong surge of emotion, they will fall into a condition that will cause them to go berserk and their minds completely destroyed. This is known as a disease called the "Border Disease", and the Origin of said region, Tyria, has once jokingly called the humans possessing these anomalous factors "Medleys".

==== Life Extending Agent ====
The bodies of the Reyvateils are given form by the song of the Triangular Nuclear Loop in their bodies, but this only applies to the Origins and Pureblooded β-Types due to the Third Generations lacking one. Because of this, the LEM (Reyvateil Life Extension Mechanism) converts the Static H-Waves that serve as their human life force into Dynamic D-Waves through magic so they may serve as a substitute for the song of the Triangular Nuclear Loop. It is due to this that the lives of the Third Generations rarely go beyond 18 years, but by giving them the Life Extending Agent, which is a mass of Static H-Waves that lack any special characteristics, the LEM will give priority to the Static H-Waves from the Life Extending Agent instead of stealing it from their life force, allowing them to live relatively as long as normal humans (however, since the usage of Song Magic puts such a heavy strain on their human bodies, they won't live beyond 40 years at most).

There are two types of Life Extending Agents: the weaker one called "Tranquility", and the stronger one called "Diquility", but people generally refer to the Diquility when they talk about the Life Extending Agent. In the world of Sol Ciel (excluding the cities of Platina and Em Pheyna), the only groups capable of mass-producing the Diquility are the Church and Tenba, but the people that work for either of them can receive Diquilities free of charge, while on the other hand it is quite an expensive product in the market. Because of this, Third Generation Reyvateils that live in this region typically seek employment with any of them. On the world of Metafalss, Diquility was discovered and invented by the first Maiden of Mio, Infel, so the Grand Bell Hall began distributing it to all the Reyvateils in the region free of any charge. Said distribution doesn't only cover the capital city of Pastalia, but also all of the areas of the neighboring Rim, which makes it an environment in which Third Generations can live without much problem. Finally, in the world of Sol Cluster, particularly the areas of Archia and the Great Fang, the Diquility is handled under the same conditions as in the Wings of Horus in Sol Ciel: it is expensive and hard to obtain. Blocking techniques to suppress the Reyvateil factors were also discovered and used in this region, advertised as "operations that would allow anyone to cut off the Reyvateil factors and the connection to the Song Servers for a cheap price", but they actually were used as a front for horrendous experiments in which the server areas of these Reyvateil patients were forcibly rewritten.

For third-generations Reyvateils, installation of the Life Extending Agent is required in all regions. When performed by someone other than a relative or supervisor, the procedure is treated as an intimate act and is generally reserved for someone with whom the Reyvateil has a close personal relationship. A first installation by a non-relative may therefore have particular emotional significance, especially when performed by a romantic partner.

=== Install Port ===
A birthmark like crest of around 5 cm of diameter that appears in the skin of all the Reyvateils in specific spots (though strictly speaking it isn't a birthmark, but part of the Grathnode compound in their bodies appearing on their skins). All of the Origins have it programmed to appear in their hips, but all other Reyvateils have their Ports appearing in very varied areas. It is through this Install Port that Grathnode Crystals can be Installed, as well as also being the place through which the Life Extending Agent is administered to Third Generations. As the Install Port carries such an important role in the maintenance of their own lives, as well as being said the part of the body that exposes the mind of the Reyvateil to anyone that looks at it, the Reyvateils will never show it to anyone excepting for people in which they have an extreme amount of trust.

As the order of configuration for the form of the Ports goes from Origins to βs, and from βs to Third Generations, the more it advances, the farther it gets from the predetermined patterns that were programmed for the ports of the Origins, and the more chaotic and fuzzy their shapes become. Previously, the Gust Shop gave away removable tattoos in the shape of the Install Ports of the heroines from the first and second games as bonus campaign items, and as it can be seen from the fact they were preconfigured designs, the Ports of the Origins are the ones that resemble the most a complete circle.

However, the Install Ports themselves aren't visible in the in-game portraits or event stills due to design concerns.

=== Song ===
In the games, writing it with the starting letter in uppercase is used to refer to the Song Magic, lyrics and spells that are sung in the Hymmnos Language in order to distinguish them from normal songs. This same distinction is also applied to the verb "to Sing". In Japanese, the distinction is made by using the kanji "詩" with the reading "uta" instead of "shi", and using "謳う" instead of "歌う" (both read as "utau") for the verb.

=== Song Magic ===
The magic that Reyvateils can use. It is invoked by singing or reciting spell phrases in a constructed language called the Hymmnos Language, and it is quite a strong weapon to wield in battle. All of the Reyvateils can materialize their fantasies into the real world in order to use them as attacks or protection, normally using Hymmnos to do so, which receives the name Song Magic. Typically, Song Magic is crafted by the act of the partner Diving into the Reyvateil's mind. Therefore, the trust the Reyvateils and their partners have for each other is of great importance for the crafting of Song Magic. However, there are exceptions, as there have been cases where a Reyvateil has crafted Song Magic in the real world all by herself, but it is a very rare phenomenon that only happens in situations that would cause extreme emotions to sprout in the heart of the Reyvateil, such as the death of a family member.
That aside, even humans that have managed to study the Hymmnos language and its origins in profundity are capable of using Song Magic, but since they wouldn't be able to receive the support of the Song Servers for it, their songs would display an extremely weak amount of power. However, there is an exception to this, as in one of the sidestory Drama CDs, the character that appeared in the first game, Spica Neal, managed to craft a Song Magic that rivaled in power that of the Reyvateils through an item called the "Carillon Organito" that was made by a little girl that resembled Krusche Elendia. However, given this was done without the support of a Song Server, it ended leaving her extremely tired.

=== Hymmnos ===
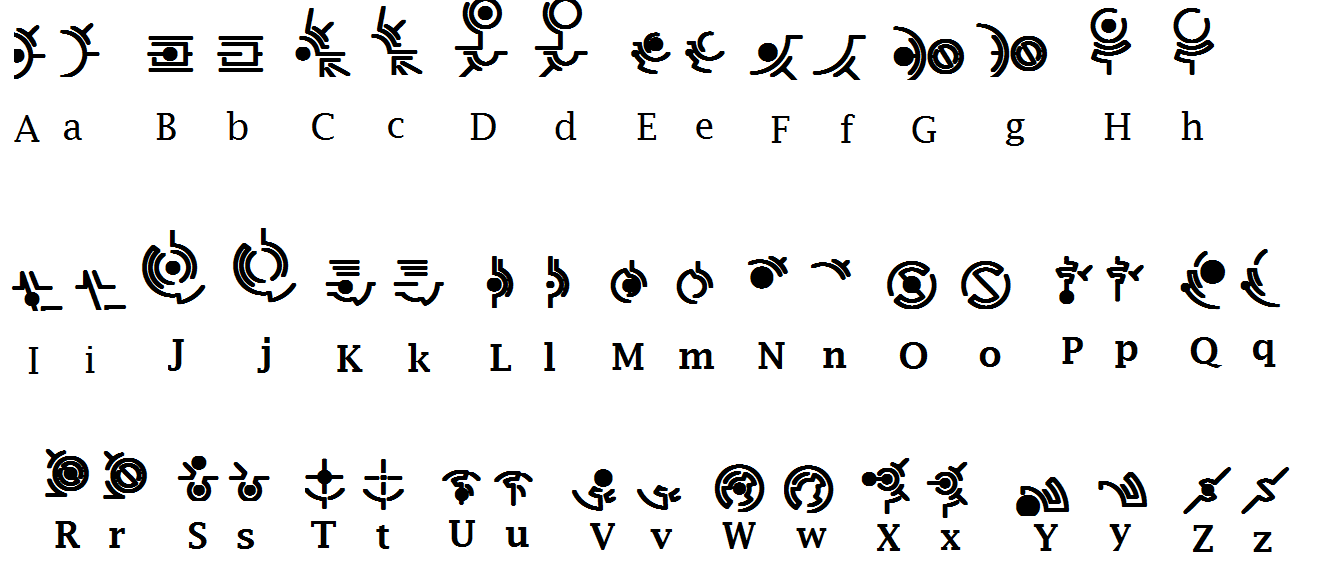
Hymmnos Glyph

The name given to the special Songs that can control the Towers, which are formally known by the name Hymmnos Extracts. They are typically found sealed in containers called Hymn Crystals (called Hymmne Crystals in the Japanese version). They are different from typical everyday Song Magic (Hymmnos Words), and by extracting the "Feelings" contained in the device inside of the crystal in a ritual called the Download Ceremony, Reyvateils become able to craft and sing a new Song out of them. However, all Reyvateils basically need to have a control key called the "Hymn Code" (Hymmne Code in Japanese) in order to Download a Hymmnos Extract, so only specific Reyvateils are granted the privilege of the Downloads (however, this doesn't apply in the case of the IPDs: due to their different Song Server, they don't need Hymn Codes at all, so no IPD Reyvateil has a Hymn Code either).
However, it is because of this power that the Reyvateils have become such a prized existence in the era the games take place, as there were technologies that allowed to use Hymmnos directly and without doing so through a Reyvateil intermediary, but all such technologies were lost in the two great catastrophes that happened centuries ago.

=== Hymn Code ===
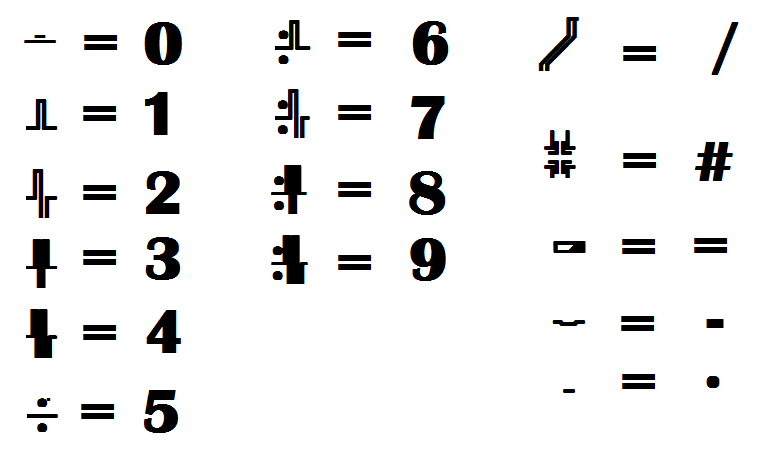
Hymmnos Glyph Numerical unit

An identifier used for distinguishing individual Reyvateils among all that are connected to the Towers, and it is used during the authentication process that takes place during the Downloads for Hymmnos. The Reyvateil Origins and the Pureblooded β-Types have their Hymn Codes registered in the database of the Tower, but the same doesn't happen for the Third Generations. Therefore, while Third Generations can use the battle Song Magic that is preinstalled in them (Hymmnos Words), they can't Download Hymmnos from the Hymn Crystals.

However, a few Third Generation Reyvateils have been able to Download Hymmnos from the Hymn Crystals and sing them. All of these were able to do this due to different reasons, all of which will be explained below:

- In the first game, Aurica Nestmile had a gene spectrum that greatly resembled that of the Pureblooded β-Type Mir, which had as the consequence that she was mistaken as possessing Mir's Hymn Code, and this allowed her to sing Hymmnos.
- In the second game, Luca Trulywaath had the D-Cellophane that serves as the proof for the Maiden of Homura Installed in her body, which had as an effect giving to her the same Hymn Code as the Reyvateil Origin Frelia, allowing her to sing Hymmnos.
- In the second game, Cloche Leythal Pastalie is an IPD and thus the Hymmnos she sings are used to control Infel Phira. As Infel Phira uses an authentication system for its Hymmnos different from that used for controlling the Towers, she didn't need a Hymn Code for the Downloads.
- In the third game, Mute used an alias Hymn Code taken from a Pureblooded β-Type that her father, Dr. Loude, gave her, allowing her to sing Hymmnos.

=== Cosmosphere ===
The mental world or Soulspace that exists within the mind of each Reyvateil. It is formed by strata that correspond to her surface psyche and her deep psyche. The world setting for each strata, or level of the Cosmosphere, greatly varies from a Reyvateil to other, but it will always reflect the personality of that particular Reyvateil. Several different iterations of that same Reyvateil, all of which represent different sides of her personality, also show up within the Cosmosphere. On the other hand, "Diving" is the act of interfering with the Cosmosphere, so there is a system called "Mind Guardians" that exist to protect the world of the Cosmosphere from people the Reyvateil herself doesn't want to interfere in her Cosmosphere or if she doesn't want them to proceed to a deeper stratum. However, it has been confirmed that getting infected by the IPD disease will cause the Mind Guardian to disappear.

The Cosmosphere is also a private space prepared for the Reyvateils within the Song Servers. Typically, a Cosmosphere has nine strata or levels, of which strata one to five correspond to the surface psyche, while stratum nine corresponds to the deepest layer of the psyche. All of the strata will have an area called the "Tower of Life", which represents the connection of the Reyvateil with her Tower. On the other hand, strata eight and nine can't be accessed in the IPDs due to how their minds are configured and the fact that they lack the border that isolates their ego from that of the other Reyvateils, the "Boundary Gate", in these strata (however, after the continent of Metafalica has been crafted and Infel Phira begins functioning as its Heart of the Land, the Boundary Gates will reappear in these strata, allowing access to them).

=== Diving ===
The act of interfering with the Cosmosphere of a Reyvateil, which is made possible through the usage of institutions called "Dive Shops", which can be found in all the regions of Ar Ciel. Given that this requires the Reyvateil to lay bare the contents of her mind to the Diver, she won't allow just anyone to do it: fundamentally, she will only allow this to a partner alongside which they have built a strong relationship of mutual trust. Therefore, when a Dive is in progress, the Diver will require a fixed number of Dive Points (DP), which are a numerical representation of the trust existing between the Reyvateil and her partner, and are consumed every time the partner triggers an event in the Cosmosphere. When the partner interferes positively in the Cosmosphere of the Reyvateil through a Dive, the following happens:

- Due to the actions of her partner in the Cosmosphere, the worries and conflicts the Reyvateil has are sublimated and a Paradigm Shift is provoked, allowing the possibility of Diving into a deeper stratum of the Cosmosphere.
- The Reyvateil crafts a new Song Magic within the Cosmosphere, allowing her to use it in the real world.
- Once the Paradigm Shift is triggered, that Cosmosphere stratum is considered as completed and the Reyvateil becomes able to use the Costume she was wearing in that particular stratum upon returning to the real world.

Furthermore, in the ninth and final stratum of the mind of every Reyvateil is the place where they are connected to the Binary Field of their Song Server, which also serves as their power source. Therefore, the closer the Reyvateils get to the ninth stratum, the stronger the Song Magic they will craft.
Once they clear the ninth level, Reyvateils become able to freely access the resources of Tower, and since this also allows them to read the data recorded in it, this allows them to enjoy a game called a "Binary Field Game" alongside their partners.
However, this doesn't mean the Reyvateils have a scenario set up for every Diver being able to reach the ninth level: there are professional Divers prepared with knowledge about counseling and psychological therapy, but said knowledge becomes useless from the fifth level onwards due to that being the point in which the true feelings of the Diver and the Reyvateil begin clashing against each other, so in these cases, the scenarios are subconsciously prepared for the Diver to reach up only to the fourth and fifth levels.
Furthermore, if the Reyvateil subconsciously feels that the Diver fears her or is not serious about her feelings, she will prepare the scenario to not allow the Diver beyond an even shallower level, which should be natural, as no Reyvateil would want to allow such a person to even Dive into her in the first place.
As the Divers who have reached the ninth level have been said to be rare enough that only a few of them live in each era, they apparently are considered as candidates to be named heroes just from having managed to complete a Cosmosphere to the end.

=== Teru Tribe ===
A race different from the humans that has existed since long ago in the planet that serves as the setting for the series. While they were born as the product of a cross between humans and non-human creatures from a different world, they have established their own community and set apart as a different race. Their physical characteristics include having a darker skin, horns and a tail (the horns and tail having a different size depending on which Teru school they belong to), and have a life span longer than that of the humans: a Teru can live around 200 years. They can also use special abilities that have no relationship at all with Song Magic, and depending on which abilities they can use, they fall in one of the twelve branches that are known as "schools". Long ago, their knowledge and abilities played a very important role in the construction of the Tower of Ar tonelico. On the other hand, a few of the schools received the name "Necrofamilies" in the region of Sol Cluster, one such example of them being the "Ayatane Necrofamily".

Long ago, their unique culture was born and nurtured in the forests of Syestine, where the Third Tower of Ar tonelico is currently located, and though it was a place rich in Songstone deposits, it was a territory that was always in dispute between the neighboring human countries and kingdoms, which tried to burn away the forest to then annex Syestine to themselves, all of which came to an end when Syestine was completely destroyed in the Seven Bloodstains Incident and the Teru joined the Sol Cluster Federation. While the Munoph (Ayatane) Teru School was supposed to use their ability to predict the future in order to avoid the happening of disasters, they instead used it to trigger the catastrophe that served as the cause for the complete destruction of the civilization that thrived during the First Era: the Grathnode Inferia.

Currently, the Teru all live only in the city of Em Pheyna in the world of Sol Ciel and actively avoid any contact with humans excepting for those living in Platina. Additionally, following the covenant they signed alongside the people of Platina, they continue protecting the areas where the most important facilities of the Tower are located, as well as keeping away the people of Tenba and the Church so they can't explore or investigate the Tower.

On the other hand, the Teru coexist with the humans in the world of Metafalss, and due to being the inventors of the technology used for Diving, most of them also make a living as Dive Shop clerks and operators. There are also half-breeds of Terus with humans and Reyvateils: they are descendants of the team of engineers known as the "People of Mio", and they used to live in the area known as Kanakana Pier.

On the world of Sol Cluster, the Teru school called "Munoph (Ayatane)" once prophesied that "the Reyvateils would take hold of the trigger for the restoration of the world", which is why they manipulated the Reyvateil country of Clustania from the shadows, but after the head of the Homuragi Necrofamily: "Homuragi Gentoku Rakujou", caused the "Ayatane War", the Archia Think Tank carried out a systematic extermination of all the living Necrofamilies, leaving them as forgotten existences. Currently, the only known living Necrofamily in this region is "Ayatane Kureha Kirinami", who was still a child at the time the Ayatane War took place, and after said war, he was sheltered by Clustania.

Below is a list of all the Teru Schools:

The Twelve Teru Schools
School name	Familiar	Unique Ability	Necrofamily Name	Characteristic Second Name	Members Appearing in the Series
Munoph	None	Prediction	Ayatane	Pel	"Ayatane Michitaka Kirinami" (original), "Ayatane Kureha Kirinami"
Plune	Gnome	Translation (transportation)	Gu	Nene	None
Nino	Owl	Voice-Listening (listening to heavenly voices)	Homuragi	Ray	"Sonia Ray Laqua (Nonsyllable Lakra)", "Homuragi Gentoku Rakujou"
Zeppen	Cat	Transformation (Physical)	Urokai	Plue	"Andante"
Jemina	Falcon	Teleportation	Ryuuuhi	Ross	"Flute Ross Loria", "Lyra Ross Reytel"
Sarra	Lilim	Superpower (explosions)	Unknown	Ma	None
Ougus	Banshee	Rain Prayer (Ability to change the weather)	Unknown	Zak	None
Alca	Flying Dragon	Wish Fulfillment	Hoshiwata	De	"Tastiella De Lu", "Harmonica De Pameli (Jack Hamilton)" (Note: While his middle name was written as "Ross" according to the setting materials collection, this later on was confirmed to be a mistake due to the initial setting information, and his correct name is confirmed to be "De"。)"
Oca	Pixie	Puppet Manipulation	Unknown	Lu	"Chester Lu Whinoah"
Noraph	Koroppokuru	Telepathy	Unknown	Sora	None
Deenel	Dryad	Growth Acceleration	Unknown	Vee	None
Plarla	Doppelganger	Reincarnation	Unknown	Low	"Adagio Low Vitis (Note: Appears in the Ar tonelico ~arpeggio~ manga. Long ago his middle name was written as "Nest", but later on it was confirmed to be a mistake due to the initial setting information, and his correct name is confirmed to be "Low".)"

== Products of the Series ==
=== Games ===
1. Ar tonelico: Melody of Elemia
2. Ar tonelico II: Melody of Metafalica
3. Ar tonelico Qoga: Knell of Ar Ciel

=== Related Products ===
Items such as an OVA, manga and light novels have been released. For more details, please read the related media releases pages corresponding to each game. The Exa Pico universe was expanded in the Surge Concerto series, with the games Ciel Nosurge and Ar Nosurge.

=== Web content ===
Below is a simple explanation about the contents found in the official site "Ar Portal", which contains all of the following alongside developer's diaries and additional information about the game world.

Toukousphere
The title translates to "Submissionsphere", and it is the part of the site that officially encouraged players to participate. Here, the characters from the games would answer to the questions the players sent them, as well as comment on the pieces of fan art they received from them. They also provided information on parts of the setting that weren't explained in a clear way in the games, as well as also giving a deeper outlook on characters that didn't have much screentime in the games. Due to its great popularity, several of its issues were compiled in a book and it even got a spin-off in the form of a Drama CD.
FLASH Cosmosphere
Flash games made in the vein of a visual novel, which follow the pattern of the Cosmospheres in the game proper. They tell sidestories not found in the games.
Hymmnoserver
A part of the website that explains the setting, script, vocabulary and grammar of the fictional language used in the games: the Hymmnos Language.
Supporteil
A blog part for the members if the Ar Portal in which the users could raise a Reyvateil customized to their own liking. This mini-game closed up operations in January 2012.
