= Atelier Iris: Eternal Mana =

2004 video game

- Developer: Gust Co. Ltd.
- Publishers: JP: Gust Co. Ltd.; NA: NIS America; EU: Koei; AU: THQ
- Director: Kazushige Masuda
- Producer: Tadanobu Inoue
- Composers: Daisuke Achiwa; Ken Nakagawa; Akira Tsuchiya
- Series: Atelier
- Platform: PlayStation 2
- Release: JP: May 27, 2004; NA: June 28, 2005; EU: March 17, 2006; AU: March 23, 2006
- Genre: Role-playing
- Mode: Single-player

Atelier Iris: Eternal Mana (Note: Japanese: イリスのアトリエ エターナルマナ, Hepburn: Irisu no Atorie Etānaru Mana) is a role-playing video game developed by Japanese developer Gust for the PlayStation 2, the first of the Atelier Iris saga. Despite the Atelier series' long run and popularity in Japan, Atelier Iris was the first of the series to be released in the U.S.; this release and the English translation were done by NIS America. Japanese voice-overs can be enabled.

== World and plot ==
Eternal Mana is set in the world of Regallzine, long the home of alchemy and mana. Wars and internal disputes have separated the kingdom of Esviore and now, the area of South Esviore where the game takes place is no longer under the control of King Slaith. Instead, each separate city-state of South Esviore runs their own affairs, trading with one another but remaining mostly separate.

The situation with Regallzine is also tied with the fate of Avenberry, a legendary city of alchemists that existed many hundreds of years before the game's beginning. No one knows exactly what happened, but it is said that Avenberry fell because of the misuse of the alchemy that ran their lives. Many alchemists and treasure hunters have come to Avenberry to try to unlock its secrets since that time, and the city of Kavoc was built for that purpose. However, none have been able to get past the gate that guards the citadel, and Avenberry's secrets have so far been preserved.

Alchemists today are few and far between, most basing their research on the studies of Iris, an alchemist who lived before the fall of Avenberry. They travel the world in search of new alchemaic artifacts for synthesis, ruins of the past, and Mana. The mana are a race of beings that allow alchemists to use their power. They augment the power of the elements which Alchemists extract from objects in the world and use them to create new and powerful magical items. Mana have feelings, emotions, and personalities just as people do, and many become good friends with their alchemist, although some people do forget about this fact.

The protagonist of the game, Klein Kiesling, is one of these wandering alchemists. His adventure begins when he stumbles across a monster in a forest, is rescued by a girl, and gets wound up in her fate and eventually, the fate of the world.

== Characters ==
=== Playable characters ===
Eternal Mana contains six playable characters. Three characters can be in a battle party, with the player free to switch the others in and out at any time.

Klein Kiesling (クレイン・キースリンク, Kurein Kīsurinku)
The protagonist of the game, Klein is a young alchemist traveling the world. He was raised by his grandmother, Daphne, who was a great alchemist, and who left him her alchemy notebook. He is now on a journey for alchemaic items and more information on Alchemy along with his Wood Mana friend, Popo. Klein becomes involved in greater things when he runs into Lita in the forest and is eventually recruited by her to become a Galgazit, or monster hunter. He uses a cane as a weapon.

Lita Blanchimont (リイタ・ブランシモン, Riita Buranshimon)
Lita is a spunky girl who works as a Galgazit in the city of Kavoc. She meets Klein when she stumbles upon him being attacked by a monster in the woods. She helps chase it off, insults Klein's fighting ability, and leaves. She eventually meets Klein again and invites him to become a monster hunter with her. Throughout the game, she develops a crush on Klein, but he never realizes it. Although Lita appears cheerful, outgoing, and perfectly normal, her past is a mystery and the events within may soon come to involve more than just herself. One of her strangest habits is becoming completely drunk after just one sip of a beverage called "Moon Milk", which she happens to love. She shares a family name with Felt and Viese, two protagonists from Atelier Iris 2. She uses metal claws for weapons. It is revealed after visiting Iris' Resting Place that Lita is an artificial life form created by Iris Blanchmont. After an encounter with Mull, her Ruby Prism, or power source, is stolen, and her mana maximum from that point on decreases naturally, only restorable by Mana Baths.

Delsus (デルサス, Derusasu)
Delsus is an alcohol-loving, anti-sweets, woman-chasing, good natured archer who resides in Kavoc. He first meets Klein in the local bar and eventually helps the alchemist and Lita escape from soldiers who want to force Klein to join their ranks. Although he can be a pervert, as Lita is quick to note, he is a good man at heart and soon becomes a repository of knowledge and a loyal member of the team. He fights with a crossbow. His home town is the village of Duran, which he reluctantly reveals as the party searches for the Eternal Land of Mana, and his full name is Sir Ghaleon Ashley Delsus Delvarood. He is the son of the chief of Duran, and ran away to avoid the Test of Parodius, the test to become the next village chief, which he passes with the help of Klein and friends.

Norn (ノルン, Norun)
Norn is a catgirl who is an apprentice magician to Zeldalia, an alchemist living in Poto's Forest. She was adopted by Zeldalia at a young age, and was taught many magical techniques. Zeldalia cast a spell on her so she can talk to the party while Norn travels with Klein. Norn joins the party after she steals Klein's grandmother's alchemy notebook and leads the party to her mentor. She frequently displays fatigue or hunger, which comes off as more catlike than human. She fights with a staff.

Arlin (アーリン, Ārin)
Arlin is a mysterious swordsman who is out for revenge against the game's villain, Mull. No one knows his reasons behind this, except he wishes to go to Avenberry for some reason. Arlin has been seen conversing with a strange Mana, although he confides nothing of his plans with the party for some time. He fights with a sword. Arlin is an artificial lifeform, like Lita, but created by Mull. He was, however, incomplete, and Mull threw him away, so Arlin seeks revenge against Mull for treating him and his 'brothers' (other lifeform experiments) so poorly.

Marietta Lixiss (マレッタ・リクシス, Maretta Rikushisu)
Marietta is a former Knight of Alkavana who left the organization when it began to become corrupt and power-hungry. She joins with Klein's group when they help her fight off pursuing knights and ends up staying around to help them save the world. She fights with a sword.

=== Non-playable characters ===
Pamela Ibiss (パメラ・イービス, Pamera Ībisu)
Pamela is a cute, giggly ghost who befriends some of Kavoc's children, and she becomes good friends with Klein's party. She has amnesia, so she cannot remember how she died, and she is looking for her original body to try to remember her past, but this does not affect her good humor. She enjoys being a ghost, and always says she's looking for a cute guy to be with.

Pamela is a recurring character throughout the Atelier series, having first appeared in Atelier Judie. She has gone on to make appearances in several Atelier games since then.

Zeldalia (ゼルダリア, Zerudaria)
Zeldalia is an old witch and alchemist. She was best friends with Daphne, Klein's grandmother, and she becomes a valued ally of the party. She is also Norn's teacher and surrogate mother. When far away, she actually uses Norn as a "telephone", making her go to sleep and talking through her. Zeldalia is wise and serious, and she recognizes Klein's importance in taking down Mull. Although her alchemical skills have maintained her superficially young, the weight of time has actually taken its toll on her, and she constantly suffers from a bad hip.

Iris Blanchimont (イリス・ブランシモン, Irisu Buranshimon)
The titular heroine of the game, human incarnation of Lilith and reputed last survivor of Eden. Iris lived during the age of Avenberry and developed the art of alchemy greatly. Her theories, called Iris' Theories, are still widely used by alchemists today, including Klein. Iris is a recurring character in the later Atelier Iris games.

Beggur (ベグル, Beguru)
Although he supposedly starts off as the main villain of the game, Beggur quickly turns into a comic relief not-so-bad guy, as the more menacing Mull takes center stage as villain. He is the leader of the Alkavana Knights, who are fanatically loyal to him. He is also Marietta's older brother.

Veola (ビオラ, Biora)
Veola is the owner of the magic shop in Kavoc. She is a very taciturn and reserved girl, bordering on anti-social, but as the game progresses she starts to open up more and becomes good friends with Klein and his crew, though she wishes she could be more than friends with Klein. Because of this, she also develops a not-so-friendly rivalry with Lita over winning Klein over, but they eventually become good friends.

Blair (ブレア, Burea)
Blair is an apprentice baker in Arcose. She was the daughter of a very rich family, but tragic circumstances led to her becoming a peasant, and she started over by becoming an apprentice to Arcose's head baker. She is very nostalgic about her past, and has a very explosive temper, but she can also be very sweet. She is also an incredibly gifted baker, and she constantly tries to develop new, more amazing styles of bread. She also secretly makes candy, and wishes to add candy to the store's menu. She also develops a slight crush on Klein.

Mull (ムル, Muru)
The game's antagonist. A former friend of Zeldalia and Daphne, as well as a gifted alchemist, Mull differed from the philosophies he was taught (Iris's theories on alchemy), and decided to follow his own path to alchemical mastery. Unfortunately, this path consists of abusing Mana to his own twisted ends. Mull romanticizes former times of strife, in which humans abused and manipulated Mana to their own ends, and seeks to revive Amalgam, an abomination created from forcibly fusing many Mana together into one powerful, mad being, which occurred years ago and caused the ruin of Avenberry. Mull and Arlin know and hate each other deeply, and he still sometimes visits Zeldalia, mostly to gloat over his successes and make fun of Zeldalia's "weakness" of using alchemy to help others instead of for personal gain.

=== Mana ===
The main driving force behind the alchemy of the game are the Mana Spirits. Some Mana have the power to transform into new, even more powerful Mana forms. Below is a list of each Mana, and their element:

Dour (木のマナ・ポポ)
The Mana Spirit of Wood. He is with Klein, who named him Popo, at the start of the game. He also provides the player with tutorials on certain aspects of the game; these tutorials often contain comic relief segments with Klein.

Uru (火のマナ・ウル)
The Mana Spirit of Fire. His special ability, Destruction Blast, allows the player to destroy certain objects on the screen.

Plua (闇のマナ・プルーア)
The Mana Spirit of Darkness. Her special ability gathers nearby monsters for the player to battle, though it does not always work.

Diemia (岩のマナ・ディエメア)
The Mana Spirit of Stone. His special ability allows him to act as a glorified stepladder so the player can reach places otherwise inaccessible...a fate he occasionally has been known to lament about.

Nymph (水のマナ・ニンフ)
The Mana Spirit of Water. Her special ability, Barrier, creates a barrier that allows the player to travel over hazards that would otherwise prove a hindrance, such as lightning and lava.

Silwest (空のマナ・シルウェスト)
The Mana Spirit of Air. She also has the Barrier action, but some rumors point to her granting flight later in the game.

Aion (命のマナ・アイオン)
The Mana Spirit of Life. She is one of the oldest of the Mana Spirits, second only to the Mana Spirit of Creation, Lilith. She has the ability to heal the entire party at will, when the player calls on her.

Eital (光のマナ・エイテル)
The Mana Spirit of Light. Her special ability drives away monsters for a limited time.

Luplus (時のマナ・ラプラス)
The Mana Spirit of Time. He is often seen with Arlin.

Grupt (力のマナ・グラプト)
The Mana Spirit of Power, and final form of Uru.

Fanatos (魔のマナ・ファナトス)
The Mana Spirit of Evil, and final form of Plua.

Flay (幽のマナ・フレイ)
The Mana Spirit of Spirit, and final form of Nymph.

Zeilia (雷のマナ・ゼイリア)
The Mana Spirit of Lightning, and final form of Silwest.

Paltia (聖のマナ・パルティア)
The Holy Mana Spirit, and final form of Eital.

== Gameplay ==
Lita selecting an action.

=== Battle system ===
The battle system in Atelier Iris is turn-based. Combat is tactical in that the party members can have their positions arranged in their half of the playing field before battle, and can be knocked back by some attacks. Each participant in the battle chooses an action from the ring of commands available. All characters can use actions such as Attack, Skill and Items but Klein, as the only alchemist of the party, can use Mana Items and Mana Synthesis (which duplicates the effects of Mana Items, at the expense of MP.) Once enemies are defeated the party gains experience, gold and possibly items. Every time a character levels up, he gains 3 points to be added to the skills of the player's choice. Characters equipped with Mana spirits gain bonus skill points.

=== Synthesis ===
As an alchemy-based game, Atelier Iris features several forms of item synthesis:

- Mana Items are created by Klein using elements extracted from objects and creatures. The extraction process destroys the target, and can thus be used in combat or to destroy obstacles. To create lasting Items, Klein requires the help of the Manas, whose health is spent in the process.
- Normal Items are synthesized by shop owners if the characters bring them the right items. These include both healing items (often in the form of food items) and pieces of equipment.
- Weapon Synthesis involves creating "mana crystals" by combining Mana stones found through the game. Each crystal can have up to three abilities, and can be inserted (or removed later) on certain pieces of equipment.

=== Exploration ===
Atelier Iris is notable for having several in-game actions that help in exploring the game's world, including unusual ones such as flying, changing into a rabbit, using a Mana as a footstool, or healing the whole party. These actions are gained each time a new Mana joins the party.

== Music ==
The soundtrack was composed by Akira Tsuchiya, Ken Nakagawa & Daisuke Achiwa and was released May 19, 2004 in Japan by TEAM Entertainment.

Opening Song

- 白夜幻想譚 (Byakuya Gensoutan / White Night Illusion) by Haruka Shimotsuki

Ending Songs

- 歩む道 (Ayumu Michi / Walking Path) by Mami Horie (Normal Ending)
- silent rhyme by Mami Horie (True Ending)

== Reception ==
Reception

Aggregate scores
Aggregator	Score
GameRankings	77.74%
Metacritic	74/100

Review scores
Publication	Score
4Players	81/100
Eurogamer	8/10
G4	3/5
GameSpot	7.2/10
GameSpy	3.5/5
GameZone	7.8/10
IGN	8/10
Jeuxvideo.com	14/20
PALGN	2.5/5
Play	7.5/10
RPGamer	2.5/5
RPGFan	90%
Diehard GameFAN	5/10
Yahoo! Games	3.5/5

Atelier Iris: Eternal Mana received mixed reviews. It received an aggregated score of 77.74% on GameRankings based on 49 reviews and 74/100 on Metacritic based on 38 reviews.
