= List of Japanese singers =

The following is a list of Japanese singers in alphabetical order.

== A ==
- Asami Abe
- Mao Abe
- Natsumi Abe
- Aco
- Yumi Adachi
- Ado
- Ayano Ahane
- Ai
- Shoko Aida
- Aika
- Ai Shinozaki
- Nanase Aikawa
- Yuzuki Aikawa
- Aiko
- Aimer
- Aimi
- Aimyon
- Aina the End
- AiRI
- Rina Aiuchi
- Kyōko Aizome
- Akari Akase
- Jin Akanishi
- Momoka Akashi
- Himika Akaneya
- Akeboshi
- Angela Aki
- Masafumi Akikawa
- Junko Akimoto
- Sayaka Akimoto
- Akino
- Rina Akiyama
- Yurika Akiyama
- Mari Amachi
- Tsuki Amano
- Yuri Amano
- Chisato Amate
- Namie Amuro
- AMWE
- Eiko Ando
- Yuko Ando
- Anna
- Annabel
- Anly
- Anri
- Anza
- Mina Aoe
- Sola Aoi
- Ai Aoki
- Yoshino Aoki
- Yuko Aoki
- Thelma Aoyama
- Tsutomu Aragaki
- Yui Aragaki
- Akino Arai
- Hisako Arakaki
- Hitoe Arakaki
- Aramary
- Kanna Arihara
- Daiki Arioka
- Tsugumi Aritomo
- Momoka Ariyasu
- Miyoko Asada
- Asaka
- Yui Asaka
- Maki Asakawa
- Yuma Asami
- Aiko Asano
- Yūko Asano
- Megumi Asaoka
- Ikue Asazaki
- Mana Ashida
- Natsuko Aso
- Kana Asumi
- Saori Atsumi
- Noriko Awaya
- Asca
- Aska
- Ayaka
- Ayaka Kitazawa
- Ayana
- Ayane
- Mashiro Ayano
- Haruka Ayase
- Mami Ayukawa
- Azu

== B ==
- Becky
- Beni
- Beverly
- Bird
- Bonnie Pink
- Steffanie Borges

== C ==
- Ceui
- Chara
- Chata
- Chiaki
- Naomi Chiaki
- Chiemi Chiba
- Reiko Chiba
- Saeko Chiba
- Minori Chihara
- Yuri Chinen
- Chocolat
- ChouCho
- Cocco
- Coppé
- Crystal Kay

== D ==
- Mao Denda
- Leah Dizon
- Daoko
- Double
- Dean Fujioka

== E ==
- Elisa
- Emi Maria
- Enako
- Kurumi Enomoto
- Chiemi Eri
- Rie Eto
- Eve

== F ==
- Ai Furihata
- Faylan
- Rie fu
- Karen Fujii
- Keiko Fuji
- Kano Fujihira
- Lena Fujii
- Miki Fujimoto
- Miki Fujimura
- Emi Fujita
- Sakura Fujiwara
- Yoshie Fujiwara
- Ichirō Fujiyama
- Kyoko Fukada
- Taeko Fukao
- Asuka Fukuda
- Haruka Fukuhara
- Miho Fukuhara
- Mai Fukui
- Mizuki Fukumura
- Satomi Fukunaga
- Miki Furukawa
- Akiko Futaba

== G ==
- Gille
- Mayumi Gojo
- Kumiko Goto
- Maki Goto
- Mariko Gotō
- Yuki Goto

== H ==
- Haco
- Halca
- Mai Hagiwara
- Chitose Hajime
- Mari Hamada
- Mari Hamada (entertainer)
- Kazco Hamano
- Ayumi Hamasaki
- Megumi Han
- Kana Hanazawa
- Hanayo
- Yukiko Haneda
- Yumi Hara
- Hitomi Harada
- Tomoyo Harada
- Luna Haruna
- Yu Hasebe
- Ai Hashimoto
- Aina Hashimoto
- Ichiko Hashimoto
- Kanna Hashimoto
- Miyuki Hashimoto
- Ryosuke Hashimoto
- Sawako Hata
- Masato Hayakawa
- Miho Hatori
- Reiko Hayama
- Akari Hayami
- Saori Hayami
- Shō Hayami
- Yoshie Hayasaka
- Asuca Hayashi
- Hiroko Hayashi
- Megumi Hayashibara
- Michiyo Heike
- Mari Henmi
- Noriko Hidaka
- Rino Higa
- Chieko Higuchi
- Yōko Hikasa
- Rika Himenogi
- Asuka Hinoi
- Emi Hinouchi
- Ayaka Hirahara
- Momo Hirai
- Akiko Hiramatsu
- Aya Hirano
- Kohmi Hirose
- Ryōko Hirosue
- Mieko Hirota
- Aya Hisakawa
- Hitomi
- Yo Hitoto
- Hitomi Honda
- Mariko Honda
- Minako Honda
- Risa Honma
- Mitsuko Horie
- Yui Horie
- Sayuri Horishita
- Takao Horiuchi
- Mai Hoshimura
- Gen Hoshino
- Mari Hoshino
- Yumiko Hosono
- Hyde

Hiroto kimura

== I ==
- Taro Ichihara
- Sayaka Ichii
- Haruyo Ichikawa
- Miori Ichikawa
- Miwako Ichikawa
- Ichiko
- Ichimaru
- Leo Ieiri
- Kaori Iida
- Mari Iijima
- Haruna Iikubo
- Mayumi Iizuka
- Elaiza Ikeda
- Riyoko Ikeda
- Rina Ikoma
- Akiko Ikuina
- Erina Ikuta
- Asami Imai
- Eriko Imai
- Miki Imai
- Asami Imajuku
- Atsuko Inaba
- Kei Inoo
- Azumi Inoue
- Kikuko Inoue
- Marina Inoue
- Shoko Inoue
- Saaya Irie
- Anna Iriyama
- Yūko Ishibashi
- Ayumi Ishida (actress)
- Ayumi Ishida (Morning Musume member)
- Haruka Ishida
- Hikari Ishida
- Miku Ishida
- Yoko Ishida
- Aya Ishiguro
- Takeo Ishii
- Kaori Ishihara
- Chiaki Ishikawa
- Rika Ishikawa
- Sayuri Ishikawa
- Satoko Ishimine
- Maiha Ishimura
- Natsuyo Ishinoda
- Yōko Ishino
- Tomomi Itano
- Kanae Itō
- Kanako Itō
- Kimiko Itoh
- Masumi Itō
- Shizuka Itō
- Yuna Ito
- Hiroshi Itsuki
- Yui Itsuki
- Mayumi Itsuwa
- Yukiko Iwai
- Junko Iwao
- Misaki Iwasa
- Hiromi Iwasaki
- Yoshimi Iwasaki
- Karen Iwata
- Rika Izumi
- Sora Izumikawa

== J ==
- Jasmine
- Missa Johnouchi
- Juju
- K. Juno
- Jyongri
- Jun Matsumoto

== K ==
- Ai Kago
- Tomomi Kahala
- Meiko Kaji
- Chie Kajiura
- Kakko
- Eri Kamei
- Aya Kamiki
- Mone Kamishiraishi
- Mika Kanai
- Sayaka Kanda
- Miho Kanno
- Yoko Kanno
- Kanon
- Shizuko Kasagi
- Yuri Kasahara
- Kimiko Kasai
- Tomomi Kasai
- Yukina Kashiwa
- Yoshie Kashiwabara
- Yuki Kashiwagi
- Rekka Katakiri
- Nana Katase
- Sayuri Katayama
- Kazuhiko Katō
- Miliyah Kato
- Shigeaki Kato
- Tokiko Kato
- Takako Katou
- Hiromi Katsura
- Chieko Ochi
- Junko Kawada
- Mami Kawada
- Tomoko Kawase
- Umika Kawashima
- Rena Kato
- Eri Kawai
- Kazumi Kawai
- Jurian Beat Crisis
- Mieko Kawakami
- Yoohei Kawakami
- Makoto Kawamoto
- Kaori Kawamura
- Miyuki Kawanaka
- Marina Kawano
- Ai Kawashima
- Umika Kawashima
- Aiko Kayō
- Kazu Makino
- Fujii Kaze
- Akita Kazue
- Keiko
- Naoko Ken
- You Kikkawa
- Moa Kikuchi
- Asami Kimura
- Ayaka Kimura
- Kaela Kimura
- Yoshino Kimura
- Youmi Kimura
- Yukina Kinoshita
- Hayami Kishimoto
- Nana Kitade
- Saburō Kitajima
- Rie Kitahara
- Sayaka Kitahara
- Eri Kitamura
- Kie Kitano
- Akari Kitō
- Izumi Kitta
- Natsumi Kiyoura
- Akiko Kobayashi
- Mao Kobayashi
- Sachiko Kobayashi
- Yumiko Kobayashi
- Kumi Koda
- Haruka Kohara
- Kyōko Koizumi
- Haruna Kojima
- Kokia
- Sayuri Kokushō
- Miho Komatsu
- Mikako Komatsu
- Arisa Komiya
- Manami Konishi
- Asami Konno
- Riyu Kosaka
- Toshiko Koshijima
- Ami Koshimizu
- Minako Kotobuki
- Kotoko
- Kotringo
- Katsutaro Kouta
- Keiichiro Koyama
- Rumiko Koyanagi
- Yuki Koyanagi
- Etsuko Kozakura
- Yurika Kubo
- Saki Kubota
- Toshinobu Kubota
- Haruka Kudō
- Shizuka Kudō
- Yoko Kumada
- Yurina Kumai
- Yurina Kumai
- Anri Kumaki
- Yoeko Kurahashi
- Mai Kuraki
- Asuka Kuramochi
- Masayo Kurata
- Minami Kuribayashi
- Chiaki Kuriyama
- Haruka Kuroda
- Meisa Kuroki
- Kuroneko
- Tomoyo Kurosawa
- Koharu Kusumi
- Natsuko Kuwatani
- Kylee
- Kotomi Kyono
- Kyary Pamyu Pamyu

== L ==
- Lecca
- Seiko Lee
- Ann Lewis
- Leyona
- Junjun
- Lia
- Lili
- Linlin
- Lisa
- LiSA
- Liyuu
- Olivia Lufkin
- Lyrian

== M ==
- MAA
- Majiko
- Mākii
- Aki Maeda
- Atsuko Maeda
- Irori Maeda
- Kaori Maeda
- Noriyuki Makihara
- Yui Makino
- Anna Makino
- Rika Mamiya
- Erina Mano
- Maon Kurosaki
- Mayu Maeshima
- Marhy
- Maria
- Kei Marimura
- Marina
- Yuka Masaki
- Keiko Masuda
- Takahisa Masuda
- Takako Matsu
- Miki Matsubara
- Ritsuko Matsuda
- Seiko Matsuda
- Miki Matsuhashi
- Jurina Matsui
- Rena Matsui
- Sakiko Matsui
- Sumako Matsui
- Chieko Matsumoto
- Rica Matsumoto
- Rio Matsumoto
- Mai Matsumuro
- Moeko Matsushita
- Yumi Matsutoya
- Aya Matsuura
- Hiromi Matsuura
- Chiharu Matsuyama
- Yumi Matsuzawa
- Matsuko Mawatari
- May J.
- May'n
- Meg
- Mell
- Melody
- Metis
- Emi Meyer
- Sayumi Michishige
- Mie
- Hitomi Mieno
- Junko Mihara
- Mihiro
- Kan Mikami
- Mika Kobayashi
- Suzuko Mimori
- Saori Minami
- Sayaka Minami
- Yoko Minamino
- Sana Minatozaki
- Milet
- Mayu Mineda
- Minami Minegishi
- Mink
- Minmi
- MIQ
- Misaki Kuno
- Aki Misato
- Sachika Misawa
- Misia
- Misono
- Hibari Misora
- Daichi Miura
- Miss Monday
- Natsume Mito
- Noriko Mitose
- Miki Matsubara
- Aika Mitsui
- Kotono Mitsuishi
- Aira Mitsuki
- Masami Mitsuoka
- Hikari Mitsushima
- Rieko Miura
- Tamaki Miura
- Miwa
- Nami Miyahara
- Sakura Miyajima
- Yukari Miyake
- Harumi Miyako
- Maki Miyamae
- Kanako Miyamoto
- Mako Miyata
- Reina Miyauchi
- Sakura Miyawaki
- Miho Miyazaki
- Sae Miyazawa
- Yuto Miyazawa
- Erika Miyoshi
- Miz
- Mai Mizuhashi
- Alisa Mizuki
- Nana Mizuki
- Kaori Mizumori
- Yui Mizuno
- Yūko Mizutani
- Kaori Mochida
- Momo
- Kanako Momota
- Maria Mori
- Momoe Mori
- Hiroko Moriguchi
- Miho Morikawa
- Rika Morinaga
- Doji Morita
- Suzuka Morita
- Chisato Moritaka
- Kaori Moriwaka
- Ryoko Moriyama
- Taichi Mukai
- Megumi Murakami
- Ayumi Murata
- Megumi Murata
- Ayaka Miyoshi
- Ayami Mutō
- Myco
- Mina Myōi

== N ==
- Hiromi Nagasaku
- Nao Nagasawa
- Miyu Nagase
- Yōko Nagayama
- Nagi Yanagi
- Shoko Nakagawa
- Meiko Nakahara
- Megumi Nakajima
- Michiyo Nakajima
- Miyuki Nakajima
- Saki Nakajima
- Yuto Nakajima
- Yukie Nakama
- Akina Nakamori
- Suzuka Nakamoto
- Yuta Nakamoto
- Akiko Nakamura
- Ataru Nakamura
- Koji Nakamura
- Maiko Nakamura
- Aya Nakano
- Tadaharu Nakano
- Mika Nakashima
- Michie Nakatani
- Miho Nakayama
- Shinobu Nakayama
- Uri Nakayama
- Yuko Nakazawa
- Yoshino Nanjō
- Yūka Nanri
- Kaori Natori
- Rey Natsukawa
- Rimi Natsukawa
- Miyabi Natsuyaki
- Haru Nemuri
- Risa Niigaki
- Hikaru Nishida
- Ryo Nishikido
- Riki Nishimura
- Kana Nishino
- Taeko Nishino
- Etsuko Nishio
- Mariya Nishiuchi
- Eri Nitta
- Mikiho Niwa
- Eri Nobuchika
- Junko Noda
- Yojiro Noda
- Nokko
- Maki Nomiya
- Ai Nonaka
- Rena Nōnen
- Arisa Noto
- John Ken Nuzzo

== O ==
- Kazuha Oda
- Sakura Oda
- Makoto Ogawa
- Mana Ogawa
- Noriko Ogawa
- Yōko Oginome
- Yui Ogura
- Yuko Ogura
- Sakurako Ohara
- Ayuru Ōhashi
- Nozomi Ōhashi
- Maki Ohguro
- Yumi Ohka
- Aika Ohno
- Mikiyo Ohno
- Nobuyasu Okabayashi
- Robin Shoko Okada
- Yui Okada
- Yukiko Okada
- Chisato Okai
- Keito Okamoto
- Mayo Okamoto
- Takako Okamura
- Ai Okawa
- Megumi Okina
- Hanako Oku
- Masami Okui
- Chiyo Okumura
- Hatsune Okumura
- Makoto Okunaka
- Judy Ongg
- Yuka Onishi
- Erena Ono
- Lisa Ono
- Ami Onuki
- Fumiko Orikasa
- Ai Orikasa
- Hanako Oshima
- Mai Oshima
- Yuko Oshima
- Vanesa Oshiro
- Kumiko Ōsugi
- Hiromi Ōta
- Shinobu Otowa
- Ai Otsuka
- Amii Ozaki
- Natsuki Ozawa

== P ==
- Phew
- Pile
- Pinko Izumi
- Pushim

== R ==
- Ray
- Rei
- Rena Uehara
- Reol
- Reona
- Rikki
- Rita
- Riya
- Rurutia

== S ==
- Saasa
- Anna Saeki
- Haruko Sagara
- Mayu Sagara
- Hideki Saijo
- Yuki Saito
- Kaori Sakagami
- Izumi Sakai
- Miki Sakai
- Noriko Sakai
- Ikue Sakakibara
- Yui Sakakibara
- Fuyumi Sakamoto
- Kyu Sakamoto
- Maaya Sakamoto
- Miu Sakamoto
- Nao Sakamoto
- Maya Sakura
- Junko Sakurada
- Makoto Sakurada
- Salyu
- Saori@destiny
- Mary Sara
- Ayaka Sasaki
- Mikoi Sasaki
- Rikako Sasaki
- Rino Sashihara
- Akemi Satō
- Chica Sato
- Chiyako Sato
- Hiromi Satō
- Masaki Sato
- Natsuki Sato
- Sumire Satō
- Mai Satoda
- Satomi'
- Megumi Satsu
- Sawa
- Shoko Sawada
- Erika Sawajiri
- Riho Sayashi
- Sayuri
- Eiko Segawa
- SennaRin
- Azusa Senou
- Manaka Senri
- Ringo Sheena
- Shela
- Kō Shibasaki
- Ayumi Shibata
- Jun Shibata
- Hekiru Shiina
- Kaori Shimizu
- Saki Shimizu
- Mariko Shiga
- Akiko Shikata
- Hiroko Shimabukuro
- Kaho Shimada
- Chiyoko Shimakura
- Eiko Shimamiya
- Hitomi Shimatani
- Haruka Shimazaki
- Saki Shimizu
- Mikuni Shimokawa
- Haruka Shimotsuki
- Eri Shingyōji
- Mariko Shinoda
- Ryoko Shinohara
- Tomoe Shinohara
- Ryōko Shintani
- Shion
- Takako Shirai
- Emiko Shiratori
- Yuri Shiratori
- Kavka Shishido
- Rumi Shishido
- Sifow
- Shanti Snyder
- Machiko Soga
- Akoya Sogi
- Sowelu
- Stephanie
- Suara
- Masashi Sada
- Anna Suda
- Masaki Suda
- Akira Sudou
- Maasa Sudo
- Eri Sugai
- Risako Sugaya
- Aya Sugimoto
- Kaoru Sugita
- Susan
- Airi Suzuki
- Ami Suzuki
- Fuku Suzuki
- Kanon Suzuki
- Konomi Suzuki
- Mariya Suzuki
- Masayuki Suzuki
- Ranran Suzuki
- Sachiko Suzuki
- Sarina Suzuki
- The Sxplay
- Syuri

== T ==
- Kana Tachibana
- Risa Tachibana
- Sachi Tainaka
- Ayumi Takada
- Ayahi Takagaki
- Reiko Takagi
- Reni Takagi
- Ai Takahashi
- Hitomi Takahashi
- Mariko Takahashi
- Mikako Takahashi
- Minami Takahashi
- Yoko Takahashi
- Yukihiro Takahashi
- Mamiko Takai
- Aki Takajo
- Mio Takaki
- Yuya Takaki
- Megumi Takamoto
- Mariko Takamura
- Satomi Takasugi
- Sara Takatsuki
- Minami Takayama
- Akane Takayanagi
- Tetsuya Takeda
- Mariya Takeuchi
- Miori Takimoto
- Nanako Takushi
- Shiori Tamai
- Nami Tamaki
- Tomoe Tamiyasu
- Eriko Tamura
- Naomi Tamura
- Yukari Tamura
- Reina Tanaka
- Rie Tanaka
- Yoshiko Tanaka
- Tomoko Tane
- Sakura Tange
- Nana Tanimura
- Shinji Tanimura
- Tao Tsuchiya
- Tarako
- Meru Tashima
- Masashi Tashiro
- Emi Tawata
- Yuya Tegoshi
- Keiko Terada
- Saho Terao
- Aoi Teshima
- Machiko Tezuka
- TiA
- Tia
- Mika Todd
- Misuzu Togashi
- Asako Toki
- Ami Tokito
- Sora Tokui
- Chinami Tokunaga
- Hideaki Tokunaga
- Tamaki Tokuyama
- Haruka Tomatsu
- Kazuki Tomokawa
- Rie Tomosaka
- Yumi Tōma
- Mariko Tone
- Nao Tōyama
- Aki Toyosaki
- Moe Toyota
- Anna Tsuchiya
- Momoko Tsugunaga
- Ayano Tsuji
- Nozomi Tsuji
- Shion Tsuji
- Noriko Tsukase

== U ==
- Ua
- Shungicu Uchida
- Yuki Uchida
- Kana Ueda
- Azumi Uehara
- Rena Uehara
- Takako Uehara
- Kana Uemura
- Yoko Ueno
- Aya Ueto
- Ayaka Umeda
- Erika Umeda
- Miyoshi Umeki
- Misako Uno
- Hikaru Utada
- Kaori Utatsuki
- Keiko Utoku
- Uru

== V ==
- Valshe
- Tomiko Van

== W ==
- Akiko Wada
- Kanon Wakeshima
- Misato Watanabe
- Hamako Watanabe
- Manami Watanabe
- Mayu Watanabe
- Minayo Watanabe
- Yoko Watanabe
- Chon Wolson

== Y ==
- Miho Yabe
- Kota Yabu
- Nako Yabuki
- Fujimoto Yae
- Mari Yaguchi
- Hitomi Yaida
- Maimi Yajima
- Etsuko Yakushimaru
- Hiroko Yakushimaru
- Ryosuke Yamada
- Yu Yamada
- Momoe Yamaguchi
- Yoshiko Yamaguchi
- Linda Yamamoto
- Sayaka Yamamoto
- Mai Yamane
- Tomohisa Yamashita
- Joann Yamazaki
- Hiromi Yanagihara
- Akiko Yano
- Hikaru Yaotome
- Aki Yashiro
- Kei Yasuda
- Rei Yasuda
- Toko Yasuda
- Kana Yazumi
- Chisa Yokoyama
- Yui Yokoyama
- Miwa Yoshida
- Soyoka Yoshida
- Takuro Yoshida
- Yoshika
- Risa Yoshiki
- Natsue Yoshimura
- Yumi Yoshimura
- Akie Yoshizawa
- Hitomi Yoshizawa
- Yo
- Yozuca
- Aira Yuhki
- Yui
- Yuka
- Yukana Nogami
- Yuki
- Saori Yuki
- Izumi Yukimura
- Satsuki Yukino
- Yūmao
- Yuria
- Yurin
- Yuuri
- Mimori Yusa

== Z ==
- Zaq
- Yo Zushi

== See also ==
- List of J-pop artists
- List of Japanese celebrities
- List of Japanese hip hop musicians
- List of Japanese idols
- List of Japanese people
- List of Japanoise artists
- List of musical artists from Japan
