= Megumi Ohori =

Japanese singer and tarento (born 1983)

- 大堀 恵
- Born: 25 August 1983 (age 43); Ōamishirasato-chō (now Ōamishirasato), Sanbu District, Chiba Prefecture, Japan
- Other names: Megumi Matsushima; Meshibe Ohori; Mētan (めーたん)
- Occupations: Singer; television personality; gravure idol; actress
- Years active: 2000–05; 2006– (AKB48 debut)
- Known for: Former SDN48 member; Former AKB48 Team K member
- Spouse: Tatsuya Kanazawa (m. 2013)
- Children: 1
- Modeling information
- Height: 158 cm (5 ft 2 in) (2012)

Megumi Ohori (大堀 恵, Ōhori Megumi; born August 25, 1983) is a Japanese singer and tarento. She was born from Ōamishirasato-chō (now Ōamishirasato), Sanbu District, Chiba Prefecture. She is represented with Horipro. She is a former member of the female idol groups AKB48 and SDN48. She is also a former model. Her real name is Megumi Kanazawa (金沢 恵, Kanazawa Megumi), and her former stage name is Megumi Matsushima (松嶋 めぐみ, Matsushima Megumi).

== Early life ==
Ohori was born August 25, 1983, in Ōamishirasato-chō (now, Ōamishirasato), Sanbu District, Chiba Prefecture, and grew up in Shinagawa, Tokyo. She is the eldest daughter of four brothers. Although she grew up in Shinagawa, she was from Chiba Prefectural Earthquake High School. She graduated from a junior college and has a teaching license in home economics. She played basketball in her school days. In club activities, she served as a secondary captain. She entered the entertainment industry as a reader model of the magazine for teenagers My Birthday (Jitsugyo no Nihon Sha, 2006), when she was a senior in high school (around 2000), and a gravure idol. There was also a period during which she was active with the stage name "Megumi Matsushima".

== Biography ==
=== AKB48 ===
When began AKB48 activities in 2005, as well as Mariko Shinoda, she worked as a staff member of a cafe in the AKB48 Theater. In addition to being posted on the last page of AKB48 First Photo Collection Mitchaku! "AKB48" – Shashin-shū Vol.1 the Debut (Kodansha), also in AKB0-ji 59-fun! (Nippon TV), VTR which reflected the appearance of Ohori of Cafe Staff period had been swept away. On 26 February 2006, she passed the Second Phase AKB48 Addition Member Audition. Later on 1 April, she made her performance debut at the AKB48 Theater on Team K's first-day performance. She had activities with Yuko Oshima and Ayaka Umeda as members of the former Team K. In her activities as a member of AKB48, there were few opportunities to be selected as selected members, and there were few opportunities such as media appeals representing members (for example, when a new song is played in PR, the selected members represent the media and appear, so opportunities do not come around). Entering in 2008, while being called "Babā" by Masaki Sata, member of Bad Boys, at AKB0-ji 59-fun!, she started to show off at a different character and performance with other members.

On 13 June 2008, she was elected for the first time as a selected member for the limited digital ninth single "Baby! Baby! Baby!" In solo deployment with gravure as her centre (particularly in the magazine King (Kodansha) for her "Mōsatsu" appearances several times, and her first photo book collaboration with the same project), she expanded the range of activities at once and appealed her presence. On 15 October 2008, she debuted solo with "Amai Kokansetsu" in the name of "Meshibe Ohori" (大堀めしべ, Ōhori Meshibe) as a project within AKB0-ji 59-fun! The sales target of her CD is set to 10,000 pieces, and if she did not achieve 10,000 pieces in one month, it was announced by Yasushi Akimoto within the same programme that he would force Ohori to graduate from AKB48. In the release event of the same song, the implementation of the Hug-kai that whispers to the fans who do not shake hands whispering has become a hot topic.

At the final event held on 15 November 2008 Meshibe Ohori Saigo no Seisen! –Hug wa Meshibe o Sukuu!–, other AKB48 members, mainly members of former team K, also support Ohori. The sales result at the end of the event was 10,125, and the members' residuals were decided. In the SKB48 13th Single Senbatsu Sō Senkyo "Kamisama ni Chikatte Gachidesu" that was carried out from June to July 2009, she was in 24th place and played in the Under Girls. From 1 August 2009, along with Yukari Sato, Kayo Noro, and Kazumi Urano, she began activities as SDN48. It was announced that full transition to SDN48 will be started from 2010 on the night performance of "Yomiuri Shimbun 135th Anniversary Concert AKB 104 Selected Members Cabinet Festival" held at Nippon Budokan on 23 August 2009. She graduated from AKB48 with the performance Team K 5th Stage "Gyaku Agari" on 21 February 2010 with a senshūraku.

=== Other projects ===
She presented her transfer to the affiliation office Horipro in night performance of AKB48 Manseki Matsuri Kibō Sanpi Ryōron held at Yokohama Arena on 25 March 2010. On 27 March 2010, she announced that she participated in the Horipro celebrity women's futsal team Xanadu loves NHC at an SDN48 performance, and at the Angel League No. 4 was held at Shinjuku Ward Shinjuku Sports Center Gymnasium on 3 April 2010, she participated in the game for the first time in the tournament.

On 9 September 2010, a result announcement was made on TV Asahi's programme Suppon no Onna-tachi which was planning to select twelve members participating in the major debut song of SDN48 (released from Universal Music on 24 November 2010). Ohori became the overall first place and won the centre position. She graduated from SDN48 in SDN48 Concer "Next Concert" in NHK Hall held at NHK Hall on 31 March 2012.

Appearing in the seventh anniversary special memorial performance of AKB48 Theater held on 8 December 2012, she announced her marriage to screenwriter Tatsuya Kanazawa. They registered their marriage on 1 January 2013 and their wedding ceremony was held in Hawaii on 16 August of the same year.

On 6 April 2013, she announced that she participated in AKB48's Senbatsu Elections as a graduated member but she was not placed in the final results.

== Personal life and public image ==
On January 11, 2013, Hori Pro, Ohori's agency, announced that she has married screenwriter Tatsuya Kanazawa. On 12 January 2014, Ohori announced that she was pregnant with her first child in her blog. She later gave birth to her first child, a daughter via cesarean section on 17 June of the same year.

Her catch phrase was "The Emperor of the Night" that she have been using since the AKB48 era, before that was "Super Loli Face" that was attached because she was seen younger than her actual age. During her time with AKB48 she was the oldest member as well as Kayo Noro. Although she was a classmate with Noro, Ohori is two months earlier on birthday, "Babā" was said to have been touched and being treated as the oldest, and was the second senior member of SDN48 after the oldest Reiko Nishikunihara.

Ohori is sometimes called "Sexy Tantō", but there are many episodes unique to that title, in an AKB48 Request Hour Set List Best 100 unit held at Shibuya-AX on 24 January 2008 appeared in a bikini appearance and surprised the audience and members while performing "Blue rose" and "Amai Kokansetsu", she made a surprise of her costume (nurse clothes, sukumizu, etc.) at "Oshi be tomeshi be to Yoru no Chōchō".

== Participating songs as a member of AKB48/SDN48 ==
=== Single CD selected songs ===
==== AKB48 era ====
- Baby! Baby! Baby!
- "Iiwake Maybe" recording
  - Tobenai Agehachō – as Under Girls
- "Labrador Retriever" recording (AKB48 graduation release)
  - Kyō made no Melody

==== SDN48 era ====
- Gagaga
- "Ai, Chuseyo" recording
  - Tengoku no Door wa 3-kai-me no Bell de Hiraku – as Under Girls A
- Min Min Min
  - Everyday, Katyusha (SDN48 ver.)
- Kudokinagara Azabujūban duet with Monta Mino
- Makeoshimi Congratulation

=== Theatre performance unit songs ===
Team K 1st Stage "Party ga Hajimaru yo" performance

- Kiss wa dameyo

Team K 2nd Stage "Seishun Girls" performance

- Blue rose
- Fushidarana Natsu

Team K 3rd Stage "Nōnai Paradise" performance

- Kurukuru pa
- Maria*
  *Ayaka Umeda's Unit Under

Himawari-gumi 1st Stage "Boku no Taiyō" performance

- Himawari
  Mariko Shinoda's standby

Himawari-gumi 2nd Stage "Yume o Shina seru wake ni ikanai" performance

- Confession
  Mariko Shinoda's standby

Team K 4th Stage "Saishū Bell ga Naru" performance

- Oshi be tomeshi be to Yoru no Chōchō

Team K 5th Stage "Gyaku Agari" performance

- Ai no Iro

Theatre G-Rosso "Yume o Shina seru wake ni ikanai" performance

- Confession
  *Mariko Shinoda, Rumi Yonezawa, and Mika Komori's standby

SDN48 1st Stage "Yuuwaku no Garter" performance

- Jajauma Lady

== Works ==
=== Singles ===
Release date	Title	Highest weekly rank	Format	Record no.	Remarks
VAP label
15 Oct 2008	Amai Kokansetsu	27th	Normal	VPCC-82626	as Meshibe Ohori

=== Videos ===
- Dolls Style Yummi! Megumi Matsushima (25 Apr 2005, Studio Plus A) – EAN 4988470170019
- Cosplay Mētan Hime (21 Dec 2005, BM Dot Three) – EAN 4580183993383
- Abunae (16 Dec 2009, Pony Canyon) – EAN 4988013961241
- Mitakatta no wa kore kashira? (7 Apr 2012, E-Net Frontier) – EAN 4571369479852

== Appearances ==
=== Variety ===
- Love Hurricane III (Tokyo MX)*regular
- AKBingo! (occasionally, NTV)
- AKB48 Neshin TV (13–27 Jul, 17 Aug, 14, 21 Sep 2007, Family Gekijo)
- Mero jp de ikou! (7 Apr 2009 – 23 Mar 2010, NKT)*regular
- Wakeari Bungee (occasional appearances) Bungee Angel
- Tokyoto-Summer Zoo (10 Apr 2011 – 28 Mar 2012, TX)*regular
- Takajin Mune-ippai (28 May, 24 Sep 2011, 4 Feb 2012, KTV)
- Gilgamesh Light (13 Jan – 21 Dec 2012, BS Japan)*regular
- Mezagura (Oct–Dec 2012, Enta! 959)*regular
- Jishaku-Megumi Ohori no Heya Nude (24 Nov 2012 (on 4th Saturday of month) – 23 Mar 2013, NotTV)*regular
- Goddotan (26 Jan 2013 –, TX)*"Ichaman Grand Prix" corner regular
- #Endan (8 Feb – 31 May, NotTV)*regular (Feb-May Friday 2013 Monthly MC)
- Megumi Ohori no Love Clinic (1 Sep 2013 (on 4th Saturday of month) – 23 Mar 2014, NotTV)*regular
- Yokuzo Ikimashita TV Emerald Green ni Kagayaku Chitei Mizūmi (19 Sep 2013, EX) traveller (guest reporter)

=== Special programmes ===
- 24 Hour Television 31 "Love Saves the Earth" Chikai –Ichiban Taisetsuna Yakusoku– (31 Aug 2008, NTV)
- 24 Hour Television 33 "Love Saves the Earth" Arigatō –Ima, ano Hito ni Tsutaetai– (28–29 Aug 2010, NTV) – Until morning Shabekuri 007 corner
- Doremifa Summers (TX, 18 Jul 2012)
- 24 Hour Television 35 "Love Saves the Earth" Mirai (25–26 Aug 2012, NTV)

=== TV dramas ===
- Koinu no Waltz Episodes 2–5 (Apr–Jun 2004, NTV) – as Ryoko Kobayashi
- Kyūmei Byōtō 24-ji Dai 3 Series (Jan–Mar 2005, CX)
- Hana Yori Dango (Oct–Dec 2005, TBS) – as student
- Tokumei Kakarichō Hitoshi Tadano 4th Season Episode 38 (26 Feb 2009, EX) – as Wakana's friend
- Majisuka Gakuen Final Episode (26 Mar 2010, TX) – as Majisuka Gakuen student
- Aoyama One Seg Kaihatsu "Jimime-dō" (6 Nov 2010, NHK One Seg 2)
- Getsuyō Golden Keiji Shoot Shūto & Muko no Jiken Nisshi series (25 Jul 2011, TBS) – as Mio Fujimori
- Suiyō Mystery 9 Keiji Seiichi Yoshinaga Namida no Jiken-bo Series 8 Niji ga Kieta Kōsaten (12 Oct 2011, TX)

=== Internet TV ===
- Choi Ama! Hachimitsu Gakuen (Oct 2010 –, Showtime)*regular
- Ruriko Kojima Ruriko no Heya (24 Oct 2011, 10 Apr 2012, 12 Jun, 9 Jul 2013, Niconico)
- Wata@Ame! (21 Nov 2011, Ameba Studio)
- Momo Kiri Gakuen Dai Hōsō! (11 Apr 2012, A'! to Odoroku Hōsōkyoku)
- Arikon Kin (12 Apr 2012, Namakoma)
- Daimaou Kosaka no Katsuage! (7 Aug 2012, Ameba Studio)
- "Megumi Ohori (Gen-SDN48), Sumire Satō (AKB48) to Eiga Kuchisake Onna o Miru Waku" Horror live broadcast (13 Aug 2013, Niconico)

=== Films ===
- Kakera (3 Apr 2010, Pictures Dept) – as Kisaragi*in the name Meshibe Ohori
- Asakusa-dō Yoi Mutan (Sep 2011, Production Committee, Princess Tenkō Pictures) – as Eri Yotsuya
- Kuchisake Onna Returns (7 Jul 2012, Jolly Roger) – Starring; as Airi

=== Anime ===
- Otona no Ikkyū-san (2016) – as Jigoku Tayū

=== Stage ===
- Tokyo Antenna Container 5th anniversary performance Shanghai J'Triangle (14–19 Jul 2010, Haiyuza Theatre Company)
- Akiko Wada Monogatari (4–14 Sep 2010, Mitsukoshi Theater) – as Shiho
- 6th Theater Company Com Concert Billiard Green (11–13 Feb 2011, Shinjuku Theater Molière)
- Tokyo Antenna Container Emergency Charity Live Everyone for All –Minna ga, minna no tame ni– (12 Apr 2011, Hakuhinkan Theater)
- Summers Live 8 (26–29 May 2011, The Galaxy Theatre)
- The Dead End (22–26 Jun 2011, Shinjuku Theater Molière) – as Mika Tsukimura
- Dump Show! (16–31 Jul, Sunshine Theatre, 10–14 Aug 2011, Sankei Hall Breezé) – as Ruriko
- Tokyo Antenna Container 11th main performance Mirai to iu Na no Kinō o Tsurete (1–10 Jun 2012, Kichijoji Theater) – as Nanami
- Fire Hip's 4th performance Heartbreak-dance!! (4, 5 Aug 2012, Kitazawa Town Hall) – as Shoko Uehara

=== Radio ===
- Yonpachi After (8 Sep 2006, Tokyo FM)
- AKB48 no Zenryoku de Kikanakya Damejan!! (3 Oct 2007 – 26 Nov 2008, Star Digio)
- AKB48 Ashita made mō chotto. (15 Oct 2007 – 26 Mar 2012, occasional appearances, NCB)
- Holiday Special bayfm meets AKB48 3rd Stage –Real– (15 Sep 2008, Bay FM)
- Recommen! (3 Nov 2008, NCB)
- DJ Tomoaki's Radio Show! (11 Jun 2009, 19 Apr 2012, Shimokita FM)
- AKB48 no All Night Nippon SDN48 Special (18 Jun 2010, NBS)
- Mu-Comi+Plus (13 Dec 2011, 21 Feb 2012, 17 Apr 2013, NBS)
- –Idol Showcase– i-Ban!! (18 Dec 2011, Nack5)
- Gocha maze'! Suiyōbi (21 Dec 2011, 28 Mar 2012, MBS Radio)
- Monta Mino no Weekend o Tsukamaero (24 Dec 2011, NCB)
- The Nutty Radio Show Oni Tamashī (2 Apr 2012, 30 May 2013, Nack5)
- Madamada Gocha maze'! –Atsumare Yan Yan– (21 Apr 2012 – 13 Apr 2013, MBS Radio)*regular
- Take2 Takahiro Azuma to Fire Hip's no All Night Nippon R (30 Jun 2012, NBS)
- Fumio Takada no Radio Beverly Hirus (25 Sep 2012, 2 Jul 2013, NBS)
- All Night Nippon Gold All Night Nippon 45-Shūnen Tokubetsu Kikaku (21 Dec 2012, NBS)
- 30-saiji Radio Oretachi wa ** janē! (28 Apr, 24 Nov 2013, Radio Nikkei)
- Gocha maze'! Kayōbi (30 Apr, 18, 25 Jun, 23, 30 Jul 2013, MBS Radio)
- Radipedia (24 Jun 2013, J-Wave)
- Megumi Ohori no Happy Time (3 Oct 2015 –, NBS)

=== Music videos ===
- Sakura no Ki ni Narō (16 Feb 2011, AKB48 Under Girls) – as Movie poster's leading actress
- Tabi no Tochū (30 Mar 2016, SKE48 Sae Miyazawa to Nakama-tachi)

=== Advertisements ===
- Lion Corporation Ban (foot model)
- Kodansha with (foot model)
- Tokyo DisneySea
- Acom "Taisetsu na Hito-tachi no Me-hen" (2008)
- U-Can Fumidas Movie "Kira Kira" (2010) – as Miss Caba

=== Internet adverts ===
- U-Can Fumidas Movie "Kira Kira" (2010) – as Miss Caba

=== Modelling ===
- My Birthday (Jitsugyo no Nihon Sha, exclusive model, two-and-a-half years)
- Tokyo 1-Shūkan (Kodansha)
- Pikora
- Marui Jassie (web model)
- Marui Ji-maxx (web model)

=== Events ===
- Summer Party Horipro 50 Shūnenkinen!! Oyobi BS-TBS Kaikyoku 10 Shūnenkinen Idol 50 Hito Dai Shūgō!! (24 Aug 2010, Akasaka Blitz)
- Yamada Denki Kaden Fair 2010 & Dai Shobun Nominoichi in Sapporo Dome (29 Aug 2010, Sapporo Dome)
- AKB48 19th Single Senbatsujan ken Taikai (21 Sep 2010, Nippon Budokan)

=== Others ===
- PlayStation Vita special software Assault Gunners image character (Jun 2012, Marvelous AQL)
- The Thing Blu-ray & DVD cheerleader (Jan 2013)

== Bibliography ==
=== Photo albums ===
- Dolls Style the Books Yummi! Megumi Matsushima (30 Nov 2005, digital photo album, Dolls Style the Books)
- Megumi Ohori×Mōsatsu Amai Kokansetsu (13 Nov 2008, Kodansha, Shooting: Tommy) – ISBN 978-4063077629.

=== Magazine serialisations ===
- King July/August 2008 issues (13 Jun, 12 Jul 2008, Kodansha)
- Gekkan Radio Life (SansaiBooks) – "SDN48 Megumi Ohori no No Future to iu Mirai" series

=== Mook ===
- Chibi Mōsatsu Volume 1 (29 Jul 2009, Kodansha, Shooting: Tommy, Kondansha Mook) – ISBN 978-4063793604.

=== Essays ===
- Saika-sō Idol –Akiramenakereba Ashita wa aru!– (25 Aug 2009, Wave Shuppan) – ISBN 978-4872904345.
