= Aika =

Aika may refer to:

== Arts and media ==
- Aika (album), a 1996 album by Finnish singer-songwriter Aki Sirkesalo
- Agent Aika, a 1997 anime OVA produced by Bandai Visual and Studio Fantasia
- AIKA Online, an MMORPG
- Aikakone or Aika, a Finnish musical group
- Aika, a character from the video game Skies of Arcadia
- Aika, a 1984 Indian short film directed by Gulzar (lyricist)
- "Aika", a song from the album Unified by Super8 & Tab
- Aika, a fictional kitsune deity character from the AIKA project

== People ==
- Aika (singer), Japanese singer/songwriter
- Aika Ando (安藤 あいか; born 1984), Japanese gravure idol and professional wrestler
- Aika Hakoyama (born 1991), Japanese synchronized swimmer
- Aika Kobayashi (born 1993), Japanese singer and voice actress
- Aika Ota (多田 愛佳; born 1994), is a former member of the Japanese idol group HKT48
- Aika Mitsui (光井 愛佳; born 1993), is a Japanese singer
- Aika Hirota (廣田 あいか; born 1999), is a Japanese YouTuber and singer
- Aika Ōno (大野 愛果; born 1977), is a Japanese singer and songwriter

== Other uses ==
- Aika, an ancient name of Troia (FG), Italy
