= Jonouchi =

Jonouchi (城之内, Jōnouchi) is a Japanese surname. It may refer to

== People ==
- Kunio Jōnouchi (ja:城之内邦雄, born 1940), a Japanese professional baseball player for the Yomiuri Giants (1962–1971) and Chiba Lotte Marines (1974)
- Missa Johnouchi (城之内 ミサ, born 1960), a Japanese composer, pianist, conductor, and singer
- Sanae Jōnouchi (城之内 早苗, born 1968), a former member of the Japanese pop music group Onyanko Club

=== Fictional people ===
- Ayame Jounouchi (城之内 綾女) of Ouran High School Host Club
- Katsuya Jonouchi (城之内 克也) (Joey Wheeler) of Yu-Gi-Oh!
- Sai Jounouchi of Angelic Layer
