= Gagaga =

2010 single by SDN48

- Type A cover

Single by SDN48

from the album Next Encore
- B-side: "Kodoku na Runner" "Eros no Trigger" "Sado e Wataru"
- Released: November 24, 2010
- Length: 3:39
- Label: Universal Music Japan
- Composer(s): Haranhn
- Lyricist(s): Yasushi Akimoto
- Producer(s): Yasushi Akimoto

SDN48 singles chronology
"Gagaga" (2010)	"Ai, Chuseyo" (2011)

"Gagaga" (stylized in all caps) is the debut single of Japanese idol group SDN48. Written by Yasushi Akimoto and composed by Haranhn, it was released on November 24, 2010, by Universal Music Japan. The single was simultaneously released in South Korea, where SDN48 performed "Gagaga" on Mnet's M Countdown.

== Tracklist ==
=== Type A ===
All lyrics are written by Yasushi Akimoto, with the exception of off vocal version tracks.

Type A (CD)
No.	Title	Music	Arrangement	Length
1.	"Gagaga"	Haranhn	Hiroshi Sasaki	3:39
2.	"Kodoku na Runner" (孤独なランナー)	Ritsuko Miyajima	Yūichi "Masa" Nonaka	3:25
3.	"Eros no Trigger" (エロスのトリガー)	SQR	SQR; j.hull	4:26
4.	"Gagaga (off vocal ver.)"			3:39
5.	"Kodoku na Runner (off vocal ver.)"			3:25
6.	"Eros no Trigger (off vocal ver.)"			4:26
Total length:				23:00

Type A (DVD)
No.	Title	Length
1.	"Gagaga"	3:39
2.	"Kodoku na Runner" (孤独なランナー)	3:25
3.	"Eros no Trigger" (エロスのトリガー)	4:26
Total length:		11:30

=== Type B ===
All lyrics are written by Yasushi Akimoto, with the exception of off vocal version tracks.

Type B (CD)
No.	Title	Music	Arrangement	Length
1.	"Gagaga"	Haranhn	Hiroshi Sasaki	3:39
2.	"Kodoku na Runner" (孤独なランナー)	Ritsuko Miyajima	Yūichi "Masa" Nonaka	3:25
3.	"Sado e Wataru" (佐渡へ渡る)	Makoto Wakatabe	Makoto Wakatabe	3:08
4.	"Gagaga (off vocal ver.)"			3:39
5.	"Kodoku na Runner (off vocal ver.)"			3:25
6.	"Sado e Wataru (off vocal ver.)"			3:08
Total length:				20:24

Type B (DVD)
No.	Title	Length
1.	"Gagaga"	3:39
2.	"Kodoku na Runner" (孤独なランナー)	3:25
3.	"Sado e Wataru" (佐渡へ渡る)	3:08
Total length:		10:12

=== Theatre version ===
All lyrics are written by Yasushi Akimoto.

No.	Title	Music	Arrangement	Length
1.	"Gagaga"	Haranhn	Hiroshi Sasaki	3:39
2.	"Kodoku na Runner" (孤独なランナー)	Ritsuko Miyajima	Yūichi "Masa" Nonaka	3:25
3.	"Eros no Trigger" (エロスのトリガー)	SQR	SQR; j.hill	4:26
4.	"Sado e Wataru" (佐渡へ渡る)	Makoto Wakatabe	Makoto Wakatabe	3:08
Total length:				14:38

== Participating members ==
=== "Gagaga" ===
"Gagaga" performed by select senbatsu performers, consisting of:

- First generation: Kazue Akita, Kana Ito, Haruka Umeda, Kazumi Urano, Megumi Ohori, Mami Kato, Haruka Kohara, Yukari Sato, Serina, Kayo Noro, Chen Qu
- Second generation: Konan

=== "Kodoku na Runner" ===
"Kodoku na Runner" performed by all 39 members of SDN48.

=== "Eros no Trigger" ===
"Eros no Trigger" performed by select Undergirls A members, consisting of:

- First generation: Misa Okochi, Megumi Imayoshi, Juri Kaida, Chisaki Hatakeyama, Hiromi Mitsui, Nachu, Reiko Nishikunihara
- Second generation: Aimi Oyama, Yuki Kimoto, Yumi Fujikoso, Natsuko, Rumi Matsushima

=== "Sado e Wataru" ===
"Sado e Wataru" performed by select Undergirls B members, consisting of:

- First generation: Sayaka Kondo, Masami Kouchi, Machiko Tezuka
- Second generation: Yuki Aikawa, Akiko, Mana Ito, Yui Takahashi, Tomomi Tanisaki, Marina Tsuda, Akane Fukuda, Miyuu Hosoda, Yuka Ninomiya

== Charts ==
=== Weekly charts ===
Chart (2010)	Peak position
Japan (Japan Hot 100)	5
Japan (Oricon Singles Chart)	3
Japan Daily (Oricon)	17
Japan Top Singles Sales (Billboard Japan)	4

=== Monthly charts ===
Chart (2010)	Peak position
Japan (Oricon)	14

=== Year-end charts ===
Chart (2010)	Peak position
Japan (Oricon)	99
