= Ayaka Hirahara discography =

- Studio albums: 14
- Compilation albums: 1
- Singles: 23
- Video albums: 2
- Concert DVDs: 3

This is the discography of Ayaka Hirahara.

== Discography ==
=== Studio albums ===
Year	Title	Chart Position	Sales/Certifications (sales thresholds)
Year	Title	JP	Sales/Certifications (sales thresholds)
2004	Odyssey: Released: February 18, 2004; Formats: CD	2	Japan sales: 723,493; RIAJ Certification: 3× Platinum
2004	The Voice: Released: November 25, 2004; Formats: CD, digital download	10	Japan sales: 176,957; RIAJ Certification: Gold
2005	From To: Released: November 2, 2005; Formats: CD, Digital download	4	Japan sales: 223,085; RIAJ Certification: Platinum
2006	Yottsu no L: Released: March 22, 2006; Formats: CD, Digital download	7	Japan sales: 70,968; RIAJ Certification: Gold
2007	Sora: Released: January 31, 2007; Formats: CD, Digital download	9	Japan sales: 33,166; RIAJ Certification: —
2008	Path of Independence: Released: December 3, 2008; Formats: CD, Digital download	6	Japan sales: 146,580; RIAJ Certification: Gold
2009	My Classics!: Released: September 2, 2009; Formats: CD, Digital download	6	Japan sales: 74,343^
2010	My Classics 2: Released: June 9, 2010; Formats: CD, Digital download	5	
2011	My Classics 3: Released: March 2, 2011; Formats: CD, Digital download	13	
2012	Doki!: Released: February 29, 2012; Formats: CD, Digital download		
2013	What I Am: Released: December 4, 2013; Formats: CD, Digital download		
2014	Winter Songbook: Released: November 12, 2014; Formats: CD, Digital download		
2016	Love: Released: April 27, 2016; Formats: CD, digital download	25	Japan sales: 7,000
2019	Hajimemashite: Released: August 21, 2019; Formats: CD, digital download	28	Japan sales: 1,934

=== Compilation albums ===
Year	Title	Chart Position	Sales/Certifications
Year	Title	JP	Sales/Certifications
2008	Jupiter: Ayaka Hirahara Best: Released: February 13, 2008; Formats: CD, Digital download	4	Japan sales: 135,863; RIAJ Certification: Gold

=== Singles ===
Release	Title	Oricon Singles Charts					Billboard Japan Charts			Album
Release	Title	Peak Positions			Sales		Hot 100	Hot Airplay	Hot Singles	Album
Release	Title	Daily	Weekly	Yearly	Debut	Overall	Hot 100	Hot Airplay	Hot Singles	Album
2003	"Jupiter"	1	2	3	6,763	924,294	—	—	—	Odyssey
2004	"Ashita"	—	19	—	10,160	32,075	—	—	—	Odyssey
2004	"Kimi to Iru Jikan no Naka de"	—	28	—	11,073	37,415	—	—	—	The Voice
2004	"Niji no Yokan"	—	22	—	8,081	18,355	—	—	—	The Voice
2004	"Blessing Shukufuku"	—	14	—	7,662	22,959	—	—	—	The Voice
2004	"Hello Again, JoJo"	—	161	—	958	958	—	—	—	The Voice
2005	"Ashita" (re-release)	—	16	93	14,672	113,430	—	—	—	
2005	"Eternally"	—	18	349	8,906	25,393	—	—	—	Yottsu no L
2005	"Banka (Hitori no Kisetsu)/Inochi no Namae"	—	16	630	6,208	11,881	—	—	—	From To
2006	"Chikai"	—	14	169	12,354	48,324	—	—	—	Yottsu no L
2006	"Voyagers/Kokoro"	—	46	—	3,329	5,321	—	—	—	Sora
2006	"Christmas List"	—	49	—	3,053	8,827	—	—	—	Sora
2007	"Ima, Kaze no Naka de"	—	14	169	12,354	48,324	—	—	—	Path of Independence
2008	"Hoshitsumugi no Uta"	—	53	1104	2,314	3,312	—	—	—	Path of Independence
2008	"Kodoku no Mukō"	—	41	1021	1,825	4,096	—	—	—	Path of Independence
2008	"Sayonara Watashi no Natsu"	—	48	—	1,594	2,124	—	—	—	Path of Independence
2008	"Nocturne/Campanula no Koi"	—	6	232	11,563	111,248	—	—	—	Path of Independence
2009	"Akane"	—	69	—	1,620	—	—	—	—	Path of Independence
2009	"Shinsekai"	—	52	—	2,628	—	—	—	—	My Classics!
2009	"Mio Amore"	—	100	—	1,001	—	—	—	—	My Classics!
2009	"Ave Maria!: Schubert"	—	—	—	—	—	—	—	—	—
2010	"Sailing My Life" (duet with Norimasa Fujisawa)	—	23	—	2,583	5,502	—	—	—	—
2010	"Keropack"	—	100	—	834	—	—	—	—	—
2010	"Ifuu Doudou/Joyful, Joyful"	—	36	—	2,134	—	—	—	—	—
2012	"Not a Love Song"						—	—	—	
2012	"Smile Smile / Boy, I Wish You Were Here"						—	—	—	
2013	"Shine / Made of Stars"						—	—	—	
Number-one songs		1	—	—						
Top-ten songs		—	2	1						
Top-twenty songs		—	9	1						

=== Video albums ===
- Ayaka Hirahara Music Video Collection Vol. 1 (2005)
- Ayaka Hirahara Music Video Collection Vol. 2 (2007)

=== Concert DVDs ===
- Live Tour 2006 “4つのL” at Nihon Budōkan (日本武道館) (2006)
- Concert Tour 2007 "そら" at International Forum (国際フォーラム) (2008)
- Concert Tour 2009 "PATH of INDEPENDENCE" at JCB HALL (2009)
