= Machiko Tezuka =

Japanese idol, and member of SDN48 (born 1986)

- Born: February 25, 1986 (age 39); Kakogawa, Hyōgo, Japan
- Occupations: bikini idol; idol
- Height: 1.58 m (5 ft 2 in)

Machiko Tezuka (手束真知子, Tezuka Machiko) (born 25 February 1986) is a Japanese idol, and member of SDN48. She has previously had careers as a gravure idol/bikini model under the stage name Ourei Harada (原田 桜怜, Harada Ōrei), and Eiko Maeda (前田 栄子, Maeda Eiko), as a member of idol group SKE48.

== Biography ==
In 2004, Tezuka began her career in the gravure business as Ourei Harada. Her first photobook, Vanilla, was released in Japan just after her eighteenth birthday. This initial success was followed up with photoshoots in several magazines and websites. In 2004 she won the Miss Magazine annual gravure idol contest put on by publisher Kodansha. According to her blog, Tezuka retired from the gravure idol world as of March 31, 2007.

Tezuka returned to the media spotlight in May, 2008 by reporting via webcast on the press release for Metal Gear Solid 4 held by Sony in Tokyo. Following her return to show business, Tezuka became a weather reporter for a regional company that provides cellphone updates. Her blog reopened during this time period only to shut down again on April 14, 2009.

On April 15, 2009, it was announced that Tezuka would be changing her stage name to Eiko Maeda and joining the pop idol group SKE48. This is a rather unusual career move for the former Japanese bikini idol who has had breast reduction surgery because even though SKE48 supposedly only allows new members who are under the age of 20, Maeda Eiko was able to join at the age of 23. On November 30, 2009, she moved to SKE48's sister group, SDN48, and change her stage name to Machiko Tezuka. She also managed a café staffed with idols.

== Songs ==
=== SDN48 B-sides (Undergirl) ===
- Kodoku na Runner (GAGAGA)
- Sado e wataru (GAGAGA)
- Tengoku no door wa 3 kai me no bell de aku (Ai, Chuseyo)
- **Abazure (MIN. MIN. MIN)**
- Yaritagaria-San (Kudokinagara Azabujuuban)
- Ue kara Natsuko (Makeoshimi Congratulation)
- Owaranai Encore (Makeoshimi Congratulation) (Graduation Song)

The bolded songs are those where she's center.

=== Stage Units ===
SDN1st - Yuuwaku no Garter

Black Boy, Jajauma Lady (under), Ganbariina, Futsuu no Anata, Best By..., Aisareru tame ni, Vampire Keikaku.

==== Minogashita kimitachi e ~AKB48 Group Zenkouen ====
Black Boy, Tengoku no Door wa 3 kai me no bell de aku, Kodoku na Runner, Touhikou, Vampire Keikaku.

With all the group Aisareru tame ni

==== Next Encore ====
Unit Songs Yaritagaria San, Tengoku no Door wa 3 kai me no Bell de aku, Abazure, Ue Kara Natsuko.

Shuffle Songs Futsuu no Anata, Best By..., Ganbariina.

With All The Group Sado e Wataru, Black Boy, Awajishima no Tamanegi, 1 gallon no ase, Aisareru tame Ni, Touhikou, Vampire Keikaku, Kodoku na Runner, Makeoshimi Congratulation, Owaranai Encore, Kodoku na Runner (Replace).

Background dancer Onedari Chanpagne

==== Minogashita Kimitachi e 2 ~AKB48 Group Zenkouen ====
Unit Songs Never!, Black Boy, Jajauma Lady, Ganbariina, Futsuu no Anata, Best By..., Touhikou, Vampire Keikaku.

With all the group Aisareru Tame ni, Kodoku na Runner, Min. Min. Min., Makeoshimi Congratulation.

== Selected works ==
- Vanilla—Debut photo collection on March 25, 2004
- Jumbo—Debut DVD on October 21, 2004

== Sources ==
- "Harada Ôrei (profile)". www.gijo.org. Archived from the original on 2013-08-21.
- "原田 桜怜 - Harada Ourei". i-dic.dorachan.com (in Japanese). Archived from the original on 2014-03-06.
