= Warren Snipe =

American rapper

Warren Snipe (born December 10, 1971), also known by stage name Wawa (also stylized in all caps), is an American deaf writer, rapper, actor and performer. He was featured in the R&B artist Maxwell's "Fingers Crossed" lyric video and has completed an album called Deaf: So What.

== Early life ==
He was born December 10, 1971. He graduated from Gallaudet University in 1994 where he became a brother of the Kappa Sigma fraternity. Snipe was also a founding member of the Wild Zappers, an all-male deaf dance company.

== Career ==
"WAWA" has worked with The National Deaf Dance Company and has been featured on television and in music videos as a dancer. He has labeled his genre as "Dip Hop," which means hip hop through deaf eyes.

Warren Snipe has also worked in two episodes of Black Lightning titled "The Book of Blood: Chapter Two: The Perdi" and "The Book of Blood: Chapter Three: The Sange" portraying Anaya's unnamed father. In the episode, his character's sign language was interpreted by Charmin Lee's character Batina.

In 2021, WAWA performed "The Star-Spangled Banner" alongside Eric Church and Jazmine Sullivan at Super Bowl LV at Raymond James Stadium in Tampa, Florida. His performance was praised by many for its enthusiasm.

On February 4, 2022, it was announced that Wawa and fellow deaf rapper Sean Forbes will be performing sign-language interpretations of the headliners' music in the Super Bowl LVI halftime show. This was the first time that sign-language performances have been incorporated into NFL's halftime program.

== Filmography ==
=== Film ===
| Year | Title | Role | Notes |
|---|---|---|---|
| 2005 | Dr. Hand | Dr. Blackeye | |
| 2011 | If You Could Hear My Own Tune | Wild Zappers Dancer | |
| 2014 | The Tuba Thieves | Arcey | |

=== Television ===
| Year | Title | Role | Notes |
|---|---|---|---|
| 2018-2019 | Black Lightning | Thierry | Guest role; 4 episodes |
| 2021 | American Masters | Translator | Episode: "Becoming Helen Keller" |
| 2022 | Fear the Walking Dead | Paul | Episode: "Follow Me" |
