= Mariko Takamura =

- Born: Takamura Mariko; 1958
- Died: May 4, 2006
- Occupation: Writer
- Known for: Cultural icon for the deaf

Mariko Takamura (高村 真理子, Takamura Mariko; 1958 – May 4, 2006) was widely described as a cultural icon for the deaf and hard of hearing in Japan. She overcame many barriers to deafness in her home country to the benefit of thousands of deaf people in Japan. It is in large part due to her efforts that the Japanese people are more appreciative of deaf culture.

When Takamura was in high school, while learning to play the guitar, she began to write her own music. When she was eighteen years old, she appeared on television, and spoke of the subsequent support she received from the Japanese public.

Mariko was a friend to many deaf people internationally, including the Wild Zappers. She introduced many deaf artists to Japan as the promoter.

Originally trained as a nutritionist, she entered the California State University at Northridge at the age of 25. After graduation, she returned to Japan to work at an English-language newspaper.

Her publications in Japanese included American Sign Language Broadened My World and Learning Sign Language in America. She provided Japanese translations of Heather Whitestone's biography Yes You Can, Heather! and Ben Bahan's book Signs for Me.

She died of cancer in 2006.
