= Rey Natsukawa =

Japanese singer

Rey Natsukawa is a Japanese singer also known as Rey Summerriver. She gives her name as Kiyo Katō as a lyricist.

== Life ==
Natsukawa was scouted when she was a student of the law department of Chuo University. She debuted as KIYO with a single "ジレンマ・男と女" (Jirenma Otoko To Onna) from King Records in 1985. After that, she and an actor Shōta Morikawa as a duo released "ラブアゲイン・別れましょう" (Rabu Agein Wakaremashō) from Century Record.

Natsukawa was active as a Japanese popular song singer, then she turned to a European popular song singer who mainly sang chanson since 1993. She studied chanson with Masako Togawa and appeared as a regular singer on a chansonnier Aoi Heya which was managed by Togawa. In 1995 she changed her stage name from KIYO into Rey Natsukawa.

Natsukawa released her first album "海から生まれしもの" (Umi Kara Umareshi Mono) from Sound Sleep Label in March, 2007. She sang "Twilight Rain" and "木もれ陽" (Komorebi) in an omnibus album "滝の詩" (Taki No Uta) from EMI Music Japan in December, 2008.
