= Lili (singer) =

Japanese singer

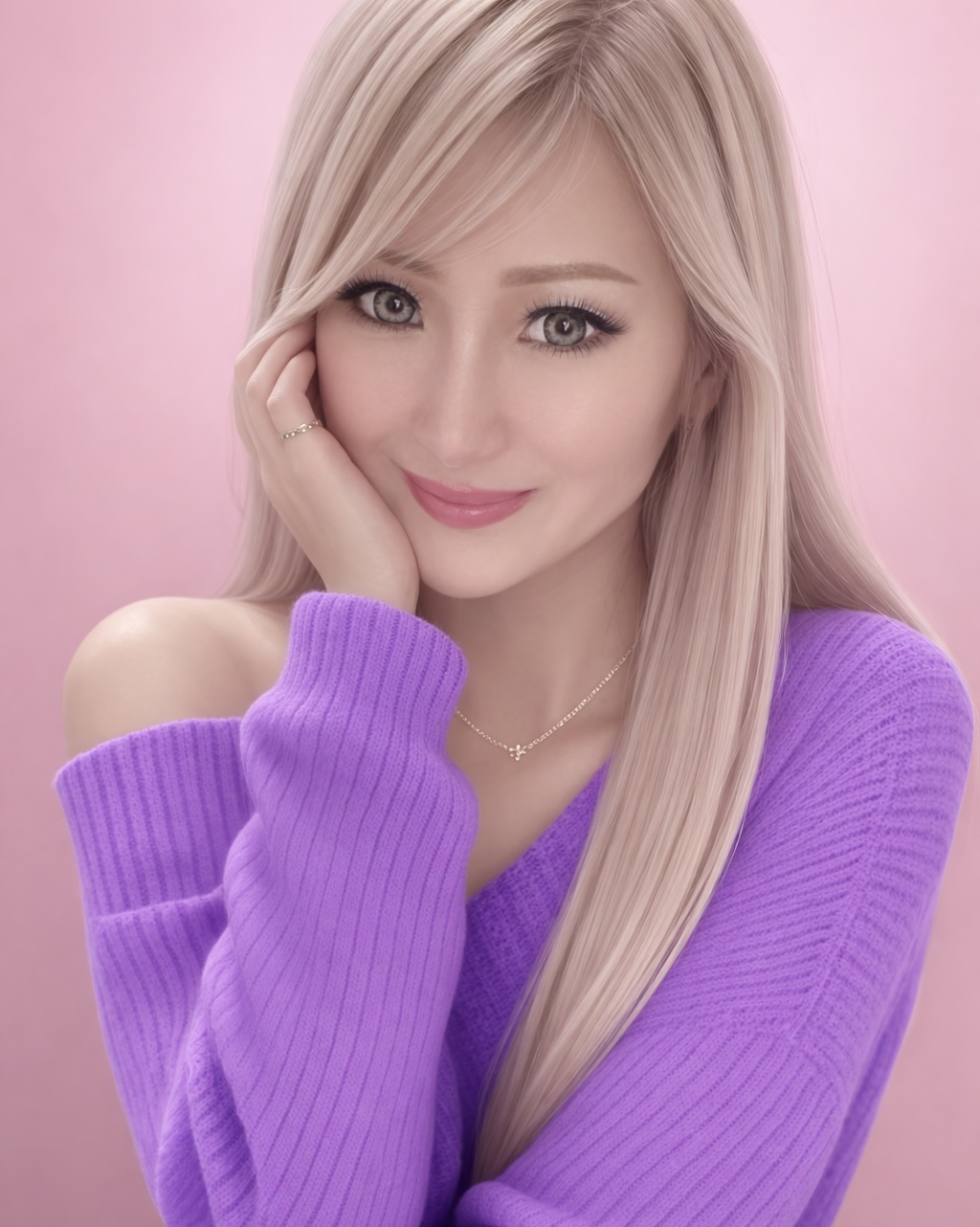

Background information
- Also known as: Lili Toyko Dreamgirl
- Born: Aichi, Japan
- Occupations: Musician, DJ
- Instrument: Singing
- Labels: Amada; DME World; Line

LiLi Tokyo Dreamgirl, is a Japanese singer. She gained recognition for her 2021 single Sushi, which peaked at the 11th position on Billboard's international chart of world albums as of October 2021. She is associated with record labels such as Amada Records, DME World, and Line Records. Additionally, she heads Tokyo Dream Girl.

== Career ==
Lili began her career with the single Invisible in 2020. The single featured Fatman Scoop and American rapper DreamDoll. The single was produced by VIRG and record labels DME World and Line Records. The producers used a dedicated project named Upload for the song to invite artists and choreographers from around the world to participate in the official video of the song. In 2021, Lili released Sushi. The song reached the 11th position on Billboard's international chart of world albums as of October 2021. In January 2022, Lili released her single "Take Your Time" with Amada Records.

== Chart ==
Song	Chart	Peak position
Sushi	Billboard International Chart of World Album	11
