= Lyrian =

Japanese moe idol and singer (born 1985)

- Born: 21 September 1985 (age 40); Milan, Italy
- Years active: 2005–2011
- Children: 2
- Website: lyrian.net

Lyrian (りりあん; born 21 September 1985) is a former Japanese moe idol and singer born in Milan, Italy. She hosts a radio show in Japan called Lyrian Moetchao in which she plays Marissa Faireborn in its Transformers: Kiss Players segment.

Lyrian also named and designed the color schemes for the Transformers toys Rosanna and Angela. She voices these characters in the radio series as well. She claims to have become a Transformer fan by watching the G1 cartoon as a child growing up in Italy.

In 2007, she released her first gravure idol DVD, titled Lyrian Chao Chao (also known as Lyrian Ciao Ciao). In the same year, she released a photo-book titled Love. In 200,9 she provided the voice of the new character Stephanie in the TVTokyo series Yu-Gi-Oh! 5D's. In 2010, she began voicing the character of Shitt. P in the Reborn! VOMIC series.

On 1 May 2011, she announced her retirement from entertainment industry. On 21 September 2014, she announced her marriage through her blog. On September 1, 2015, she gave birth to her first child, a baby girl. On 5 August 2017, she gave birth to her second child, a baby boy.

== Sources ==
- Lyrian at the Japanese Idol Directory
