= Wild Zappers =

American all-deaf dance group

- Formation: Established in 1989
- Founder: Irvine Stewart

The Wild Zappers is an all deaf all male dance group that combines American Sign Language, music and dance to promote the education of sign language to both Deaf and hearing communities.

== Background ==
The Wild Zappers was formed by Irvine Stewart in 1989. The group is composed of Fred Beam (director), Warren Snipe (Assistant Director), Irvine Stewart, Ronnie Bradley, Michael Davis, Matt Andersen (né Dans), Kris Pumphrey, Sam Franklin, Buck Rogers, and George Azmaveth. The group has performed all over North America and has also toured internationally. They perform to popular music like "Escapade" by Janet Jackson or "Imma Be" by The Black Eyed Peas. The Wild Zappers also occasionally tour and dance with the National Deaf Dance Theatre. Videos of Wild Zappers performing can be watched on YouTube.

The Wild Zappers have two main workshops focusing on American Sign Language and Deaf culture education. "Sign Me a Story" was developed for elementary aged children. "Let's Sign and Dance" is targeted towards families and teaches how Deaf people perform along with American Sign Language.

== Organization ==
Invisible Hands Inc.

Fred Beam founded Invisible Hands, Inc. to promote awareness of Deaf culture. This non-profit organization recruits groups like the Wild Zappers who want to promote Deaf culture through the arts. They also provide professional training to educate the Deaf to find employment in the arts field. The Wild Zappers and National Deaf Dance Theater are sponsored by Invisible Hands, Inc.

== Dance Style ==
The Wild Zappers perform using hip-hop and funk dance styles. Although they cannot hear the music they dance to, they utilize eight counts to keep a beat. They can also feel vibrations from the music, and a few members of the group wear hearing aides.

== Public Exposure and Outreach ==
Awards

Fred Beam and Warren Snipe have won the Linowes and Media Access Award. Fred Beam was also selected for Essence Magazine "Real Men of the Year" in 2006 for his work in the Deaf community.

Black Deaf Expo

Fred Beam established and hosts the Black Deaf Expo. He also served on the board of Black Deaf Advocates and was once the President of National Black Deaf Advocates. He established a theater program to teach artistic leadership to people of color at Gallaudet University

== Theatrical Appearances ==
If You Could Hear My Own Tune

The Wild Zappers appeared in the movie "If You Could Hear My Own Tune" which premiered in January 2011. The film explores the challenges of communication and understanding that arise when hearing and non-hearing communities come together.
