= Anna Saeki =

Anna Saeki 冴木 杏奈（さえき あんな）
- Born: Asahikawa, Hokkaidō
- Genres: Tango
- Occupation: Singer

Anna Saeki (Japanese: 冴木 杏奈 or さえき あんな) is a Japanese singer with Moon Music. She was born in Asahikawa, Hokkaidō, and has a notable presence in the music industry, particularly in genres like Tango.

== Career ==
After she was crowned as Miss Sapporo in 1984, she made her debut as a tango singer.

From 1999, she has been touring in Europe, South and North Americas, and Asia, by a commitment of the sponsoring organization "Harmony of Shining Women Foundation". She has been an actress and presenter as well. In 2008, she received the award "20 people contributed to Tango", for the first Japanese artist ever.

- Hobby-Pottery, painting, flower arranging.
- Belonging to the Ozawa music office. Served as a Wednesday Assistant for "11PM" (NTV).
- Joined in long-established salsa band, "Orquesta del Sol" in September 1997. Recorded "Besame Mucho" produced by Sergio George in New York.
- performed a live concerts and dinner shows with Orquesta del Sol in more than 40 locations nationwide from November 1998.
- Held a concert in Hawaiit, and in Paris in April 2000, also in New York in June.
- "Tango Concert Tour" started April 2001 to commemorate the 15th anniversary of debut.
- Held the national longitudinal, "Tango Concert Tour 2002" in April 2002.
- Had a performance inviting Paris mayor in March 2004. A performance in Hawaii in April. "Tango Concert Tour 2004" Hiroshima Aster Plaza Blue Note and five other halls in May. Christmas dinner show performance concert in Berlin in December.
- In May 2005, held a concert in New York Carnegie Hall (Zankel Hall), also did recordings in New York with co-starred band.
- Invited as a representative of Japan to "Asian Festival 2005" in Berlin, Germany in September.

Invited as a representative of Japan to "Asian Festival 2005" in Berlin, Germany in September. Performances in Paris Champs Elysees Theater. Performances in Korea, Tokyo Prince Hotel Park Tower, Motion Blue Yokohama, Nagoya Marriott Associa Hotel, Hotel Granvia Hiroshima.

== Albums ==
Her first album was "Tango Primavera".

1. Tango uranai
2. Tsumetai anata
3. Demeranoche
4. Beranono umibe
5. Keshin
6. Kiiroibarano tango
7. Yuwakusarete kirawarete
8. Koino nofrage
9. Taxi
10. Isu(shirya)

Her most recent album was "Tangos del Mundo".

1. Tango Wa Ai
2. On Broadway
3. Love of My Life
4. Eleanor Rigby
5. Fragildad
6. Claro de Luna
7. The Winner Takes It All
8. Over the Rainbow
9. Habanos de Buenos Aires
10. Yesterday Once More
11. De Sol a Do
12. Cantar Es Vivir
13. Ballenas
14. Cantar Es Vivir

== Film ==
The ending theme of a film which Anna cast Watashi no Michi (My Life) is going to be released around June 2012. It will be a single CD including 3 songs, "Inochino tango" (Tango of life). The musical "Tenshino diaary" (Angel's diary) was in theater in Japan from March to April.
