= Serina (actress) =

Japanese entertainer (born 1985)

Serina 芹那
- Also known as: Serinko (せりんこ); Celina (セリーナ, Serīna)
- Born: Kana Serikawa (芹川 可奈, Serikawa Kana); May 19, 1985 (age 41); Iwamizawa, Hokkaido, Japan
- Occupation: Entertainer
- Years active: 2006 -
- Formerly of: SDN48

Serina (芹那; born May 19, 1985, in Iwamizawa, Hokkaido, Japan) is a Japanese entertainer who is a former member of the idol group SDN48 and previously represented by the talent agency, A-Plus.

== Biography ==
In 2008, Serina was nominated for high school girls uniform competition run by Weekly Young Jump.

On August 1, 2009, she became a member of SDN48. Up until October 15, Serina had been fabricating her age by three years. Her reason for doing that was that "My school banned working in the entertainment industry, so I did it so as not be found out."

On March 31, 2012, all members of SDN48 graduated and their last performance was SDN48 Concert "Next Encore" in NHK Hall in NHK Hall.

== Filmography ==
=== Dramas ===
Year	Title	Role	Network	Notes
2007	Operation Love	Serina Kojima	Fuji TV	
2008	Bloody Monday	Terrorist Hyo	TBS	Episodes 9 to 11
2012	Ghost Mama Sōsa-sen: Boku to Mama no Fushigina 100-nichi	Minami Yoshinaga	NTV	
2013	Saikō no Rikon	Nana Umino	Fuji TV	
2013	Tenma-san ga Yuku	Rika Mukunoki	TBS	
2014	Ofukou-san	Rika Matsu	NHK BS Premium	Episode 2
2014	Tamagawa Kuyakusho of the Dead	Ko Nohara / Rina Kirishima	TV Tokyo	Episode 9

=== Educational series ===
Title	Network	Notes
NHK Kōkō Koza Basic 10	NHK E	

=== TV series ===
Year	Title	Network	Notes
2008	Gravure no Bishōjo	Mondo TV	
2010	Suppon no Onna-tachi	TV Asahi	
2010	All-Star Thanksgiving	TBS	
2011	Umapuro!	Fuji TV	
2011	AKBingo!	NTV	
2011	Terry Ito no Nehorihahori	TV Tokyo	
2012	Sekai Naze Soko ni? Nihonjin: Shira Rezaru Haranbanjō-den	TV Tokyo	

=== Films ===
Year	Title	Role	Notes
2006	Wasedadaigaku Kawaguchi Geijutsu Gakkō Sotsugyō Seisaku Sakuhin: Trot House		Lead role
2009	Instant Numa	Koga	
2010	Rambling Hearts: Love Hotels	Ayaka Shirai	

=== Stage ===
Year	Title	Role	Notes
2008	Chika 100-do Senjō no Alice	Alice	Lead role

=== Advertisements ===
Year	Title	Notes	Ref.
	Ajinomoto "Amino Vital Singing Climing"		
	Nissin Foods Donbee "Kabushikigaisha Donbee Setsuritsu"		
	Kobayashi Pharmaceutical Easy Fiber "Hot Mikka"		
	Konami Digital Entertainment Jikkyō Powerful Pro Yakyū Portable 3 "Kōsai"		
	Duskin! Mosdo! MOS Burger Mister Donut "Hot Chicken Pie"		
	Dole Food Company "Dole Banana Dole Man Dai Katsuyaku?!"		
	Universal Studios Japan		
2011	Mobcast "Mobadabi"		
2013	Jumbo Karaoke Hiroba		
2013	Noevir Group Tokiwa Pharmaceutical "Minmin Daha"		
2014	Sangaria "Tennen Mizu no Tansan Mizu"		
2015	DMM.com		

=== Others ===
Title	Notes
Art Project "Taicoclub"	
Rookies Yahoo! Japan Collaboration Ad	
Girl Friend Beta	
