= Satoko Ishimine =

Japanese female singer-songwriter (born 1975)

Satoko Ishimine 石嶺 聡子
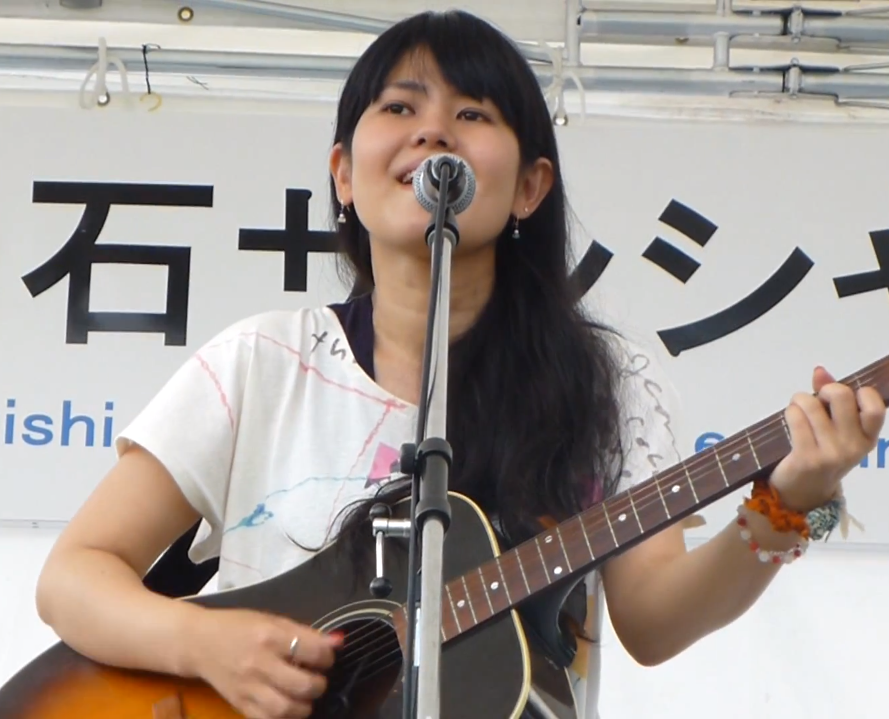
- Satoko Ishimine at Hatsuishi Sunshine Summer Fun Festa, August 2012

Background information
- Born: October 3, 1975 (age 50); Naha, Okinawa, Japan
- Genres: Pop, folk, soul
- Occupation: Singer-songwriter
- Instruments: Vocals, guitar
- Years active: 1994–present
- Labels: EMI Music Japan; PRHYTHM; Tokuma Japan
- Website: satokoishimine.com

Satoko Ishimine (石嶺 聡子, Ishimine Satoko; born October 3, 1975) is a Japanese female singer-songwriter. She rose to fame in 1992 when she won the grand prix of the 16th annual Nagasaki Singing Festival at the age of 16, which resulted in her receiving a recording contract with Toshiba EMI.

After she graduated from high school, Ishimine traveled to Los Angeles, California, to receive voice training and dancing lessons. In November 1994, she released her first single Doyōbi to Pen to Udedokei (Saturday, Pen and Wristwatch).

In March 1995, Ishimine won first prize at the 5th NHK's Newcomer Singing Contest. In May, she released a cover version of the renowned song Hana, originally recorded by Shoukichi Kina, for the film Himeyuri no Tō (The Tower of Himeyuri). This, her third single, sold over 500,000 copies. She was selected to participate in the 46th annual NHK Kōhaku Uta Gassen with the song at the end of the year.

== Life and career ==
=== Early life ===
Satoko Ishimine was born the third girl of three sisters in Naha City, Okinawa Prefecture, Japan. Her family loved listening to such legendary foreign musicians as The Carpenters and The Beatles. She started dreaming of becoming a professional singer when she was ten-year-old.

=== Success and struggle ===
Through the initiating years of her career, Ishimine established her popularity for the public as an Okinawan singer, especially due to the hit of her third single Hana. Nevertheless, she did not want to be regarded as such a matured vocalist with modest and magnificent songs as people liked her to perform those days. After five years since the debut, she started writing lyrics as she strongly desired to express herself with her own words. Around 2000, she began to play acoustic guitars to build her own style of an independent musical performer within herself.

=== Independence for change ===
In January 2001, Ishimine released her last original album for Toshiba EMI Closet, in which she was committed to writing the lyrics of more than a half of the entire songs. In 2003, she ended the contract with EMI and transferred her label to PRHYTHM. The first album for the new label Bloomy Balloon was one of the most motivated records in her career that she produced all the lyrics and most of the melodies for all the tracks. She cooperated in the whole creation of the album with the male guitarist and composer Hikaru Ishizaki, who resulted in getting married with Ishimine in March 2006.

=== Exploring another vista ===
After the ten years since she encountered her first spouse and the seven years of their marriage, Ishimine announced that she divorced Ishizaki in May 2013. Eventually for the first time in ten years, she released three songs on iTunes in the end of June. With the help of a musical director Ayami Matsuo, Ishimine produced the first cover album in her career that contains no original songs, which was released for the label Tokuma Japan in September 2014.

== Discography ==
=== Singles ===
Year	Single	Album	Label
1994	Doyōbi to Pen to Udedokei	INNOCENT, Best Collection, NEW BEST 1500, CD&DVD THE BEST, Golden Best	Toshiba EMI
1995	Watashi Ga Iru	INNOCENT, Best Collection, NEW BEST 1500, CD&DVD THE BEST, Golden Best	Toshiba EMI
1995	Hana	INNOCENT, Best Collection, Ballad Song Stories, NEW BEST 1500, CD&DVD THE BEST, Golden Best	Toshiba EMI
1996	Namida Wa Iranai	passion, Best Collection, NEW BEST 1500, CD&DVD THE BEST, Golden Best	Toshiba EMI
1996	Kumori Nochi Hare	passion, Best Collection, NEW BEST 1500, CD&DVD THE BEST, Golden Best	Toshiba EMI
1996	Liberty Girl	GENERATION, Best Collection, NEW BEST 1500, CD&DVD THE BEST, Golden Best	Toshiba EMI
1997	Hajimete Wo Sagasanakucha	Best Collection, NEW BEST 1500, CD&DVD THE BEST, Golden Best	Toshiba EMI
1997	You don't know	Imagination, NEW BEST 1500, CD&DVD THE BEST, Golden Best	Toshiba EMI
1998	Omoikiri Naitemo Iiyo	Ballad Song Stories, NEW BEST 1500, CD&DVD THE BEST, Golden Best	Toshiba EMI
1998	Bye-bye	Ballad Song Stories, NEW BEST 1500, CD&DVD THE BEST, Golden Best	Toshiba EMI
2000	Mafuyunohanabi	Closet, Ballad Song Stories, CD&DVD THE BEST, Golden Best	Toshiba EMI
2001	Tenki-ame	Ballad Song Stories, CD&DVD THE BEST	Toshiba EMI
2003	Utatane	Bloomy Balloon	PRHYTHM
2013	Konosekaio		Download on iTunes
2013	ten-year-old		Download on iTunes
2013	Okurimono		Download on iTunes

=== Original albums ===
Year	Album	Track	Label
1995	INNOCENT	Kaze Wo Kanjitai / Watashi Ga Iru / LOVE & DREAM / Sayonara wa Asu no Hajimari / Doyōbi to Pen to Udedokei / Yume no Tsuzuki wa Love Song / Mouhitori no Watashi / Namida Nanka Nagasanai / Arigatou / Kesshin / Say you love me / Hana (Album Version)	Toshiba EMI
1995	situation	Koibito / Choukyori Denwa no Asa / Aozora / Egao Todokimasuka / Zeitaku na Calendar / Aozora no X'mas Time	Toshiba EMI
1996	passion	FLY TO YOU / Kumori Nochi Hare / Fight / Anohi Wo Odoritai / Natsu no Taiyou / MY LOVE / Namida Wa Iranai / 20th Door / Hoshiiyo / Meguriai / Asian Dream	Toshiba EMI
1996	GENERATION	Liberty Girl / Shine / Koufuku Domino / Those were the days / Goodbye / Summernight Magic / Koi Ja Nasakenai / Tomodachi? / Sotto...Jitto...Kitto...Zutto / Aki no Yukue	Toshiba EMI
1997	Imagination	Watashi Rashiku / Ayamachi / Kamisama ni Kanshashite / Imashikanai "Arigatou" / My Home Island / CONFESSION CONFUSION / Little Romance / Maboroshi Nankajanai / You don't know / IMAGINATION	Toshiba EMI
2001	Closet	Aoi Shizuku / Rosemary & Time / Mafuyunohanabi / Suisou / Mado no Tsuki / voice / Kakera / Garakuta / Aitakute Aenakute Yumewomite (Album Version) / story	Toshiba EMI
2003	Bloomy Balloon	Hikousen / Yasashii Hitoe / Meiro / Utatane / Veranda / Tokyo Nikki / Taion / Hane / Todokanai Ao / Fu-sen no Sora	PRHYTHM

=== Cover albums ===
Year	Album	Track	Label
2014	LAMP ~nostalgia for tomorrow~	Les Champs-Élysées / There Is Nothing More To Say / Raindrops Keep Fallin' on My Head / Hard Times Come Again No More / Take Me Home, Country Roads / Don't Worry, Be Happy / The End of the World / TOMORROW / HANA (Bonus Track)	Tokuma Japan Communications

=== Compilation albums ===
Year	Album	Track	Label
1997	Best Collection	Watashi Ga Iru / Aozora / Kaze Wo Kanjitai / Doyōbi to Pen to Udedokei / Namida Wa Iranai / Meguriai / Hana (Single Version) / Kumori Nochi Hare / Shine / Matenrow no Hero / Hajimete Wo Sagasanakucha (New Version) / THE LONGEST TIME	Toshiba EMI
2002	Ballad Song Stories	Hana / Asian Dream / My Home Island / Omoikiri Naitemo Iiyo / Kamisama ni Kanshashite / Imashikanai "Arigatou" / Bye-bye / Suisou / Mado no Tsuki / Kokoro no Oto / Tenki-ame / Mafuyunohanabi / Anatanosobani / 100 Nen no Omoi	Toshiba EMI
2005	NEW BEST 1500	Doyōbi to Pen to Udedokei / Watashi Ga Iru (New Version) / Hana (Single Version) / Namida Wa Iranai / Kumori Nochi Hare / Liberty Girl / Hajimete Wo Sagasanakucha (New Version) / You don't know / Omoikiri Naitemo Iiyo (New Version) / Bye-bye	Toshiba EMI
2005	CD&DVD THE BEST	Hana (Single Version) / Doyōbi to Pen to Udedokei / Watashi Ga Iru (New Version) / Namida Wa Iranai / Kumori Nochi Hare / Kaze Wo Kanjitai / Meguriai / Hajimete Wo Sagasanakucha / THE LONGEST TIME / Aozora / Liberty Girl / You don't Know / Omoikiri Naitemo Iiyo / Bye-bye / Mafuyunohanabi / Tenki-ame	Toshiba EMI
2011	Golden Best	Hana (Single Version) / Doyōbi to Pen to Udedokei / Kaze Wo Kanjitai / Watashi Ga Iru (New Version) / Namida Wa Iranai / Kumori Nochi Hare / Liberty Girl / Shine / Hajimete Wo Sagasanakucha / Matenrow no Hero / You don't Know / Omoikiri Naitemo Iiyo (New Version) / Bye-bye / Mafuyunohanabi / Aitakute Aenakute Yumewomite / Hidamari	EMI Music Japan
