= Yukari Miyake =

Japanese singer

Yukari Miyake 三宅 由佳莉
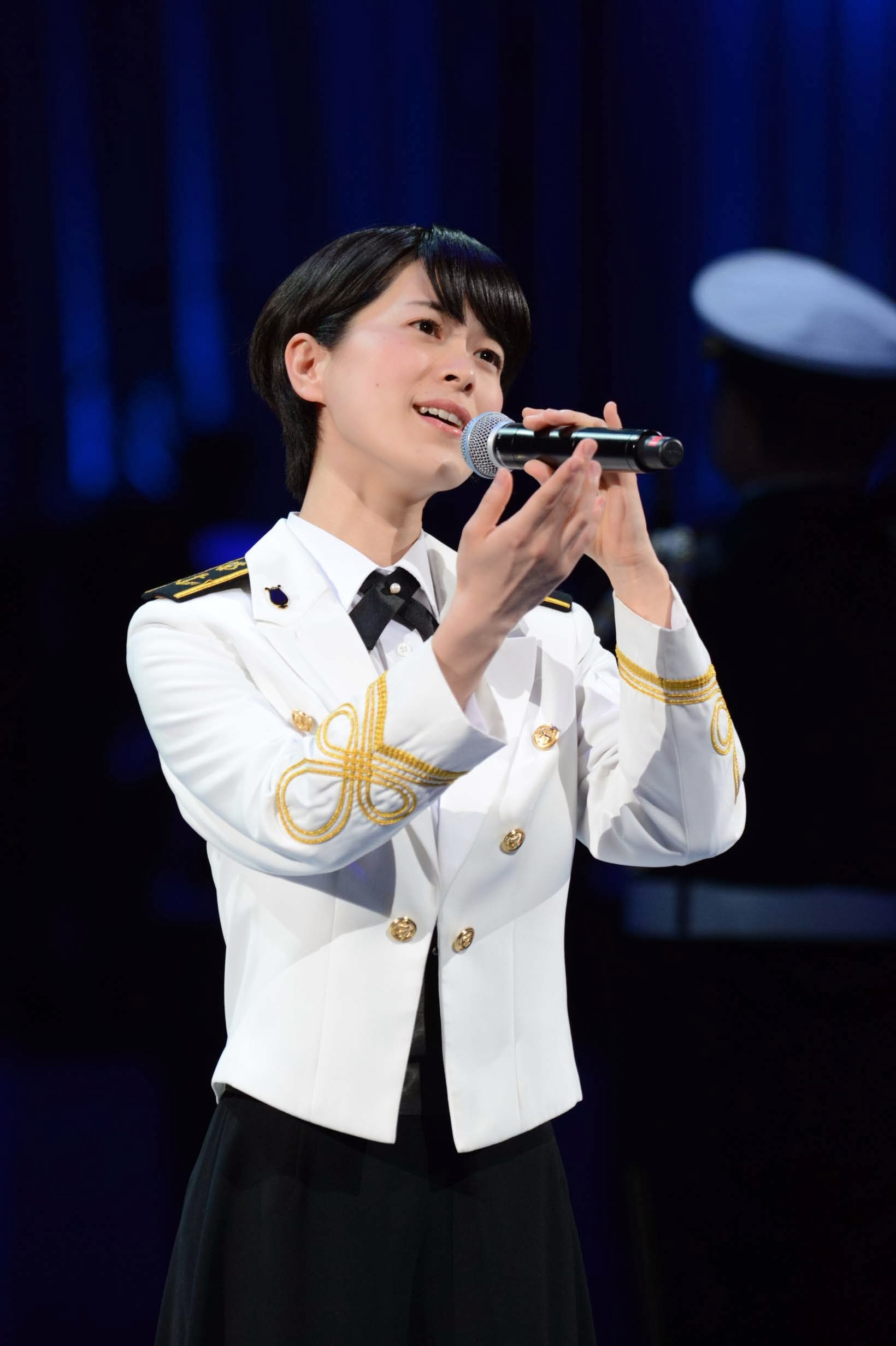
- Miyake in 2013

Background information
- Born: December 14, 1986 (age 39); Kurashiki, Okayama Prefecture, Japan
- Genres: Classical music
- Occupation: Non-commissioned officer at JMSDF

Yukari Miyake (三宅 由佳莉, Miyake Yukari; born December 14, 1986) is a Japanese singer and naval officer who is the vocalist of the Tokyo SDF Band. The first and only official vocalist for the Music Corp to join the Japan Maritime Self-Defense Force (JMSDF), Miyake has released a number of CDs she sang with the SDF Band. She holds the rank of petty officer 2nd class in the Japanese Navy.

== Early life ==
Yukari Miyake was born in Kurashiki, Okayama Prefecture in Japan on December 14, 1986. During her childhood, she used to sing with her grandmother and sang in a juvenile singing troop. A musical performed by Takarazuka Revue, an all-female troupe, attracted her interest in musicals. As Miyake could not visit the theatre very often, she watched videos lent from her piano teacher. She recalls that the musicals by Shiki Theatre Company and Toho were her favorites.

An admirer of musicals during her youth, Miyake graduated from Okayama Joto High School (in Japanese) in Okayama which offers music course and continued vocal education at the College of Art of Nihon University. She had the ambition to become an actress in musicals, and to sing one day on the stage. After graduation, she was employed by a department store, which had no connection to music. As she thought her ambition would fade forever when she would start working at her new office in April, Kaoru Watanabe, a professor of hers advised her to join the JMSDF, where she could have the chance to be a member of the military music band. Miyake applied to be the first Music Corp vocalist position the JMSDF has ever offered, after an interview with an officer at a recruiting fair before joining the retail store. Following her enlistment in April 2009, Miyake underwent a five-month long basic training including running and firing a heavy rifle. Even the boat training on sea water caused her waist skin to peel off. She admitted that she had not thought the basic training would be so hard, although she performed karate sport in the college to develop physical strength.

One day, upon her commanding officer's request, Miyake sang "Tsubasa o Kudasai" ("Give Me Wings") in front of her fellow trainees. The audience, which did not pay attention in the beginning, were later much touched and thanked her. She stated that "it was the first time that I was thanked for singing a song". Miyake so understood "what it means to sing for people as a member of the SDF".

The first three years were frustrating for Miyake. She had studied classical music, and thought she could continue to work in that genre. However, the demands of the band meant that she could not sing Japanese popular songs in classical style.

== Musical career ==
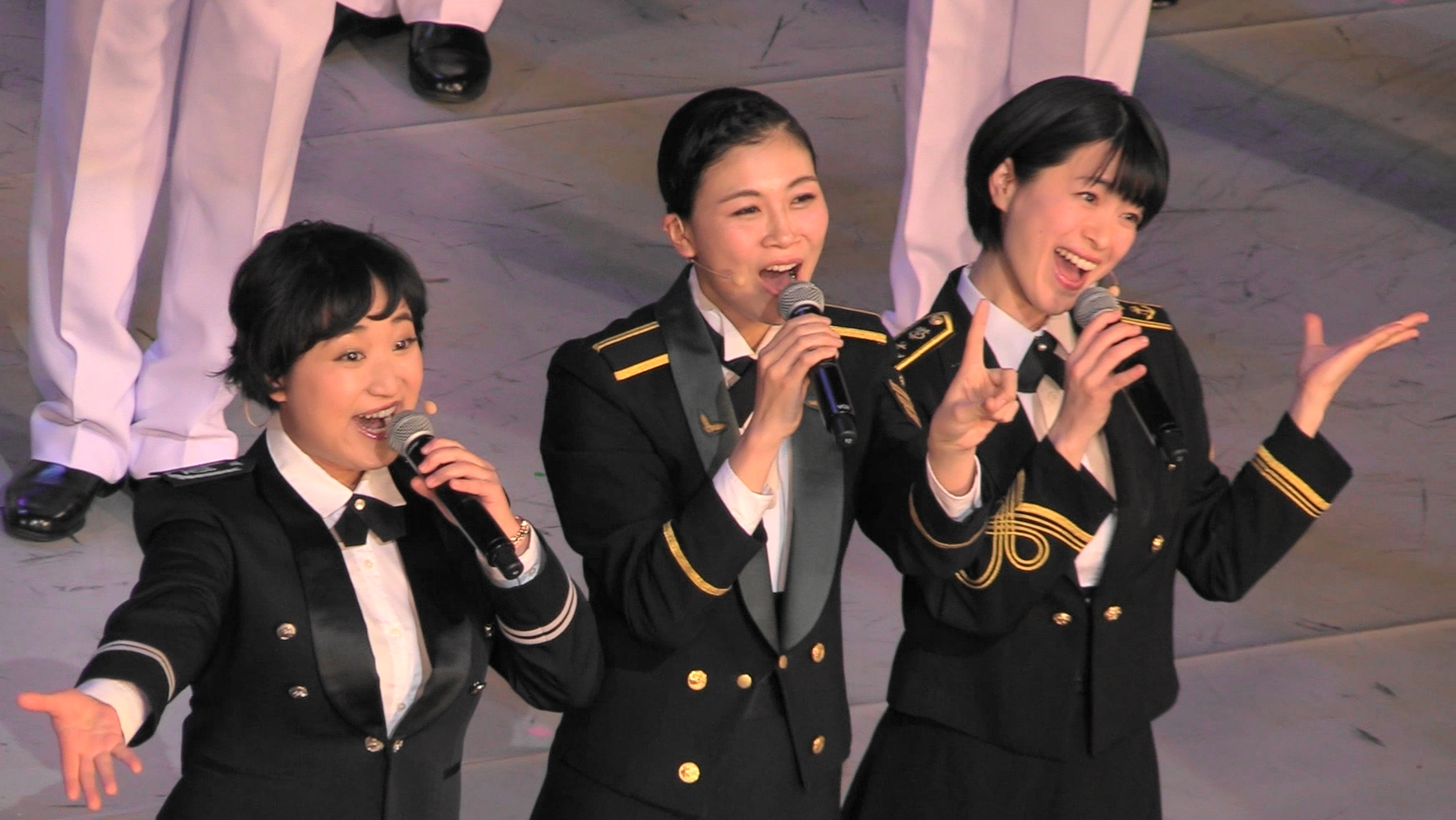
Japanese female military singers with Yukari Miyake (right) at JSDF Marching Festival 2017 (Budokan)

By July 2013, Miyake uploaded the song "Inori" ("A Prayer") in piano version to YouTube, which was composed in honor of the relatives of the 2011 Tōhoku earthquake and tsunami victims. News programs featured the song. By the end of August that year, she released her debut CD titled, "Inori — Mirai e no Utagoe" ("A Prayer — Songs for the Future") accompanied by the Tokyo Self Defense Force Band. Already in early September 2013, the album reached top of the classical music section of the Oricon charts.

Miyake, a Petty officer third class in charge of personnel, is the first singer employed by the 230,000-personnel strong SDF and the only soprano singer of the Tokyo SDF Band. She is nicknamed "Diva of the JMSDF Band". She appears in about 120 concerts a year.

Miyake wrote the lyrics of one song in her second album. By the end of October 2017, Miyake released her fifth album titled "Sing Japan: Kokoro no Uta" ("Songs of the Heart") featuring 14 popular songs. She finds it challenging to perform popular songs because she would better sing them in a classical way. This was the case as she sang "Kawa no Nagare no Yō ni" ("Like the Flow of the River"), a famous song by Japan's iconic singer Hibari Misora.

== Discography ==
- Miyake, Yukari (August 28, 2013). "A Prayer", JMSDF Tokyo Band with Yukari Miyake ("A Prayer", Kaijo jiei-tai Tokyo ongaku-tai, Miyake Yukari) (CD) (in Japanese). Universal Music Japan. ASIN B00EFF1AIC.
- Miyake, Yukari (2013). Beyond the Sea (CD) (in Japanese). Universal Music Japan.
- Miyake, Yukari (March 4, 2015). Hope — Songs For Tomorrow (Kibou) (CD) (in Japanese). Universal Music Japan.
- "Sound up! Brass band heroes", JMDFS Tokyo Music Band with Yukari Miyake ("Hibike! Buraban hiiroozu", Kaijo jiei-tai Tokyo ongaku-tai, Miyake Yukari). March 30, 2016. ASIN B019QW8N3S.
- Miyake, Yukari (June 1, 2016). "The Best —Deep Blue Spirits"; JMSDF with Yukari Miyake (Kaijo jiei-tai Tokyo ongaku-tai, Miyake Yukari) (CD) (in Japanese). Universal Music Japan.
- Miyake, Yukari (2017). Sing Japan (CD) (in Japanese). Universal Music Japan.
