= Manaka Senri =

Japanese singer

- Born: 千里愛風; October 4, 1979 (age 46)
- Origin: Fukuoka Prefecture, Japan
- Genres: J-pop
- Years active: 2005–present

Manaka Senri (千里 愛風, Senri Manaka; born 4 October 1979 in Fukuoka prefecture) is a female Japanese pop singer. She debuted with the single, I LIKE THE WAY, composed by BULGE, which reached 28 on the weekly Oricon. Her newest single, Tori no Uta / PLACE contains the opening and ending themes for the hit Japanese anime series, Jūsō Kikō Dancouga Nova, where Tori no Uta is the opening theme, while PLACE is the ending theme.

== Discography ==
=== Mini Album ===
==== [2006.04.12] Never Gonna Let You Go ====
- 1・NEVER GONNA LET YOU GO
- 2・FLY AWAY
- 3・LOVE YOUR ALL
- 4・cookie
- 5・I LIKE THE WAY -Album Mix-
- 6・光
- 7・恋 -Album Mix-
- 8・Tears

==== First press DVD bonus ====
- 1・I LIKE THE WAY -Album Mix- Promotion Video
- 2・NEVER GONNA LET YOU GO Promotion Video

=== Singles ===
==== [2005.08.17] I Like The Way / 恋 ====
- 1･LIKE THE WAY : ＜OUT☆PUT＞ エンディングテーマ
- 2･恋 : 株式会社 飯田産業CMソング

==== [2007.04.11] 鳥の歌 / Place ====
- 1・鳥の歌
- <獣装機攻 ダンクーガ ノヴァ> オープニング曲
- 2・PLACE
- <獣装機攻 ダンクーガ ノヴァ> エンディング曲
- 3・SCENE -by your side-
- 4・鳥の歌(カラオケ)
- 5・PLACE(カラオケ)
