= Mako Miyata =

Japanese singer

Mako Miyata (宮田 真子, Miyata Mako) is a Japanese singer and vocalist. She became the singer of one of the Kirby games albums: Hoshi no Kirby - Story of the Fountain of Dreams. It was officially released on the Kirby's Adventure soundtrack CD in Japan. It contains eight songs with actual lyrics sung to Kirby tunes. The rest of the CD is the actual game music, totaling 37 tracks and all.
