= SDN48 =

Japanese idol girl group

- Also known as: Saturday Night 48
- Origin: Akihabara, Tokyo, Japan
- Genres: Pop
- Years active: 2009–2012
- Label: Nayutawave
- Past members: List of members

SDN48 (read S.D.N. Forty-Eight, short for Saturday Night 48) was a Japanese idol girl group, created and produced by Yasushi Akimoto. SDN48 was created based on an "adult idol" concept. Former AKB48 member Kayo Noro was chosen as the captain of the group. In November 2010, the group made their major label debut with "Gagaga". The group ended with a farewell concert on March 31, 2012.

== History ==
=== 2008–2009: Formation ===
In 2008, AKB48 producer Yasushi Akimoto decided to create a "Saturday Night 48" show, based on the concept of an "adult idol" that would perform every Saturday at 10 pm. The shows were restricted to fans aged 18 and older. He also wanted to differentiate from AKB48's usual uniforms with sexier attire. In July 2009, two AKB48 members, Megumi Ohori and Kayo Noro, were chosen as the first two members of the group. At the same time auditions were held to find other members. The SDN48 debut stage Yūwaku no Garter (誘惑のガーター, Yūwaku no Gātā; "Garter of Temptation") was held on July 25. At the end of AKB48's three-day Nippon Budokan concert the teams were reshuffled, leading to the removal of Kayo Noro, Megumi Ohori, Yukari Sato, and Kazumi Urano, leaving them to focus solely on SDN48 activities. Noro was also made the captain of the group.

It was announced on September 27, 2009, that understudy Yuki Iwata had departed from the group for health reasons. Two months later, Eiko Maeda was transferred from sister group SKE48 to SDN48. Upon joining the group Maeda changed her stage name to Machiko Tezuka.

=== 2010–2011: Major label debut ===
During their first anniversary concert, Noro announced to the audience that SDN48 would debut under Universal Music in the fall. The group also suggested they would be eliminating the age restriction. Through their TV show, Suppon no Onna-tachi (すっぽんの女たち), SDN48 held a senbatsu (選抜; lit. selection) election to determine the top twelve members who would participate in their debut single. Former AKB48 member Megumi Ohori ranked first in votes and was given the center position. The single would be titled "Gagaga" and be released on November 24, 2010. On September 30, second generation member Sakura Fukuyama announced through her blog that she would be leaving the group due to health problems. Chinese member Chen Qu was chosen as Fukuyama replacement. The group was scheduled to release their second single "Ai, Juseyo" (愛、チュセヨ, Ai, Chuseyo; "Love, Give Me Please") on March 23, 2011; however, due to the Tōhoku earthquake and tsunami on March 11, the single was postponed until April 6.

=== 2012: Disbandment ===
On March 31, 2012, all the members graduated from the group and the group was disbanded. On April 19, 2012, former SDN48 members participated in AKB48's 2nd revival stage concert which took place on May 15.

=== 2013: Reunion and new projects ===
On March 31, 2013, one year after the disbandment, an SDN48 reunion concert was held at AKB48 theater.

On May 6, 2013, it was announced that seven former members were creating a new group called 7cm. The group was under Avex and the members include Juri Kaida, KONAN, Mana Ito, Haruka Umeda, Megumi Imayoshi, Mami Kato and Miyuu Hosoda. The group disbanded on August 30, 2013.

== Members ==
=== First generation ===
- Kazue Akita
- Megumi Imayoshi
- Haruka Umeda
- Kazumi Urano (former AKB48 Team B member)
- Misa Okochi
- Megumi Ohori (former AKB48 Team K member)
- Jyuri Kaida
- Mami Kato
- Masami Kochi
- Haruka Kohara (former AKB48 Team B member)
- Sayaka Kondo
- Yukari Sato (former AKB48 Team A member)
- Serina
- Chen Qu
- Machiko Tezuka (former SKE48 member)
- Nachu
- Reiko Nishikunihara
- Kayo Noro (Captain; former AKB48 Team K member)
- Chisaki Hatakeyama
- Hiromi Mitsui

=== Second generation ===
- Yuki Aikawa
- Akiko
- Mana Ito
- Aimi Oyama
- Yuki Kimoto
- Konan
- Yui Takahashi
- Marina Tsuda
- Natsuko
- Akane Fukuda
- Yumi Fujikoso
- Miyuu Hosoda
- Rumi Matsushima

=== Third Generation ===
- Seara Kojo
- Hitomi Komatani (former AKB48 Team A member)
- Saemi Shinahama
- Jung Si-yeon
- Hana Tojima (former AKB48 Team A member)
- Miray

=== Former members ===
- Ayami Nakazato (graduated December 24, 2009), a former Kishidan back dancer, and OZ-MAX member Ayami of DJ OZMA
- Sakura Fukuyama (graduated October 2010)
- Kana Ito (graduated February 2011)
- Yuka Ninomiya (graduated May 2011)
- Tomomi Tanisaki (graduated May 2011)
- Sayo Hayakawa (graduated July 2011)

Understudy

- Yuki Iwata (withdrew September 24, 2009)

== Discography ==
=== Singles ===
Year	Single	Charts		Album	Oricon sales	
Year	Single	JPN	KOR	Album	First week	Total sales
2010	"Gagaga"	3	27	Next Encore	63,627	79,128
2011	"Ai, Chuseyo"	3	—	Next Encore	64,020	71,236
2011	"Min Min Min"	3	—	Next Encore	72,584	82,543
2011	"Kudokinagara Azabu-Jūban Duet With Mino Monta"	3	—	Next Encore	67,018	69,885
2012	"Makeoshimi Congratulation"	2	—	—	74,459	90,507

=== Albums ===
Year	Album	Charts	Oricon sales	
Year	Album	JPN	First Week	Total sales
2012	Next Encore	1	48,085	50,312
2012	Yūwaku no Garter	31		

== SDN48 1st Stage "Yuuwaku no Garter" ==
All SDN48's members did perform only one stage, "Yuuwaku no Garter". They usually were divided as 1st and 2nd/3rd generation stages. They performed at the AKB Theater.
