= Kazue Akita =

Japanese singer

Kazue Akita (穐田和恵, born February 23, 1985 in Ikeda, Osaka, Japan) is a Japanese singer. She graduated from SDN48 as a 1st generation member.

== Songs ==
=== Album songs ===
- 1 Gallon no Ase (Next Encore)

=== SDN single (Senbatsu member) ===
- GAGAGA (1st single)
- Kudokinagara Azabujuuban Duet With Mino Monta (4th single)
- Makeoshimi Congratulation (5th single)

=== SDN B-side (as undergirl) ===
- Kodoku na Runner (GAGAGA)
- Tengoku no Door wa 3kaime no Bell de Aku (ai, Chuseyo)
- Onedari Champagne (MIN.MIN.MIN)
- Owaranai Encore (Makeoshimi Congratulation) (Graduation Song)

== Units ==
=== Team Z ===
- Koi no Owara

== Stage units ==
=== SDN1 "Yuuwaku no Garter" ===
- Saturday Night Party (1#)
- Never! (2#)
- Black Boy (3#)
- (UNIT) Yuuwaku no Garter (4#)
- Ganbariina (8#)
- Futsuu no Anata (9#)
- Best By... (10#)
- Aisareru Tame ni (11#)
- Kodoku na Runner (Encore 1)
- Touhikou (Encore 2)
- Vampire Keikaku (Encore 3)

== Solo songs ==
- Haruiro no Tsubasa

== Minogashita Kimitachi e ~AKB48 Group Zenkouen ==
=== Unit songs ===
Saturday Night Party, Never, Black Boy, Tengoku no Door wa 3kaime no Bell de Aku, Ganbariina, Futsuu no Anata, Best By..., Kodoku na Runner, Touhikou, Vampire Keikaku, GAGAGA.

=== With all the group ===
Aisareru Tame ni.

== "NEXT ENCORE" ==
=== Unit songs ===
Saturday Night Party, Never, Tengoku no Door wa 3kaime no Bell de Aku, Kudokinagara Azabujuuban, Haruiro no Tsubasa, Yuuwaku no Garter, Onedari Champagne, GAGAGA.

=== Shuffle songs ===
Futsuu no Anata, Ganbariina.

=== With all the 39 members ===
Sado e Wataru, Black Boy, Awajishima no Tamanegi, 1 Gallon no Ase, Aisareru Tame Ni, Touhikou, Vampire Keikaku, Kodoku na Runner, Makeoshimi Congratulation, Owaranai Encore, Kodoku na Runner (Replace)

== Minogashita Kimitachi e 2 ~AKB48 Group Zenkouen ==
=== Unit songs ===
Saturday Night Party, Never, Black Boy, Touhikou, Vampire Keikaku, GAGAGA.

=== With all the Group ===
Aisareru Tame ni, Kodoku na Runner, Min. Min. Min., Makeoshimi Congratulation.
