= Ayaka Hirahara =

Japanese pop singer (born 1984)

Ayaka Hirahara 平原 綾香
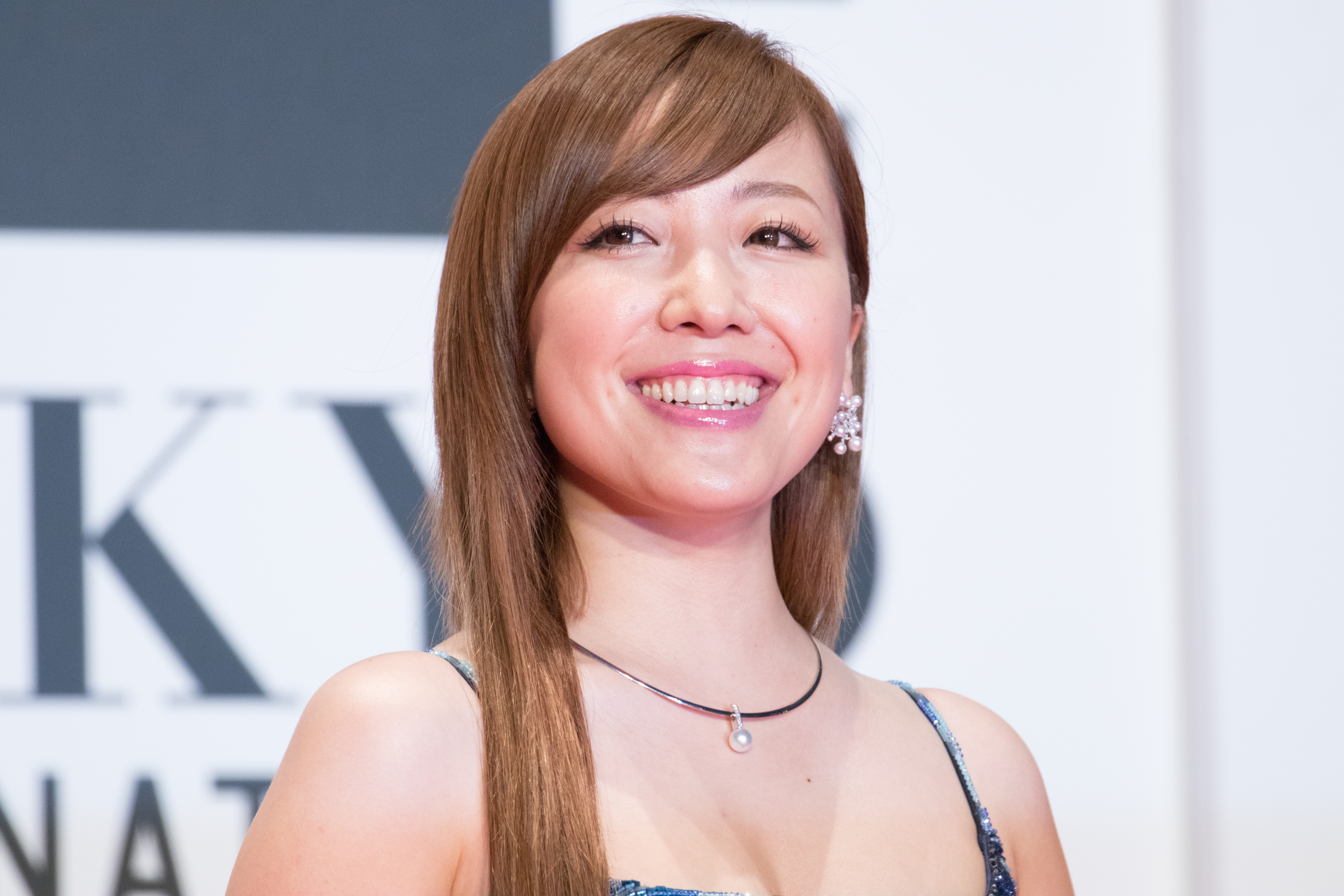

Background information
- Also known as: A-ya (あーや)
- Born: May 9, 1984 (age 42)
- Origin: Tokyo, Japan
- Genres: Japanese pop, classical
- Occupations: Singer, songwriter
- Instruments: Vocals, saxophone
- Years active: 2003–present
- Labels: Dreamusic (2003–2013); Universal/EMI Japan (2013–present)
- Website: www.camp-a-ya.com

Ayaka Hirahara (平原 綾香, Hirahara Ayaka; born May 9, 1984) is a Japanese pop singer. She was affiliated with the Dreamusic label until 2013 when she moved to Universal Music Japan.

== Biography ==
Hirahara comes from a musical family; her father, Makoto Hirahara, is a saxophone player, her grandfather, Tsutomu Hirahara, was a trumpet player, and her older sister, Aika Hirahara, also is a singer under the EMI Music Japan label. Ayaka was a member of the Matsuyama Ballet for 11 years, beginning at age 6. She started playing saxophone when she was 13 years old, then learned classical saxophone at Senzoku Gakuen High School. Currently, she is studying in the Faculty of Jazz majoring in saxophone at Senzoku Gakuen College of Music. Her first single, "Jupiter", was released in Japan in December 2003, and went on to be one of the biggest selling singles of 2004. The melody of the song is based on the "Jupiter" movement in The Planets Suite by Gustav Holst. Similarly, the melody of her song, "Siciliana", is based on "Siciliano" by Johann Sebastian Bach.

She then released a series of classical themed My Classics albums from 2009 to 2011. She continued her career on Dreamusic until 2013. Shortly after, she moved to Universal Music Japan under Nayutawave Record and released her debut single on the Universal label, titled "Tsubasa" (Wing). She released another single, titled "Shine - 未来へかざす火のように" on November 13, 2013. The single was used for soundtrack of the Koei game Nobunaga's Ambition. She released her debut album with Universal on December 4, 2013. On November 1, Universal revealed the track list of Ayaka's next album (one of which is her cover version of "I Dreamed a Dream" from Les Misérables). The aforementioned album reached #32 on Oricon Ranking.

Hirahara also stars in musicals such as Christine Daae in Love Never Dies (2014-2025), Carole King in Beautiful: The Carole King Musical (2017-2020), Mary Poppins in Mary Poppins (2018), Yuria in Fist of the North Star (2021-2022) and Satine in Moulin Rouge! (2023-2024, 2027). She also dubbed the roles of Maria in the Japanese dubbing of The Sound of Music for its 50th anniversary and Mary Poppins in the Japanese dubbing of Mary Poppins Returns.

== Discography ==
=== Studio albums ===
- Odyssey (2004)
- The Voice (2004)
- From To (2005)
- Yottsu no L (2006)
- Sora (2007)
- Path of Independence (2008)
- My Classics! (2009)
- My Classics 2 (2010)
- My Classics 3 (2011)
- Doki! (2012)
- What I Am (2013)
- Winter Songbook (2014)
- Prayer (2015)
- Love (2016)
- Love 2 (2017)
- Hajime Mashite (2019)

=== Compilation albums ===
- Jupiter: Ayaka Hirahara Best (2008)
- 10th Anniversary Singles Collection: Dear Jupiter (2013)

== Theme songs ==
Hirahara's song Reset, from the album Yottsu no L was used in Capcom's 2006 title, Ōkami, as the ending song. An orchestral version, "Reset – Thank You Version", also was made by Hiroshi Yamaguchi.

Also appearing in the anime Saiunkoku Monogatari was Hirahara's song, "Hajimari No Kaze" (also from Yottsu no L). The song was used as the show's opening theme song for the two seasons that were aired.

Her version of the song "Tsubasa o Kudasai" appeared in episode 5 of the drama Orthros no Inu sung under the stage name Ray.

"Sailing My Life" (featuring label mate Norimasa Fujisawa), from the album "my Classics 2", is the official OST for the Japan release of the Disneynature film Oceans.

Ayaka Hirahara recorded "The Name of Life" (いのちの名前, "Inochi no Namae") by Joe Hisaishi from the Studio Ghibli film Spirited Away.
