= Missa Johnouchi =

Japanese musician (born 1960)

- Born: 1960 (age 65–66)
- Occupation: Musician

Missa Johnouchi (城之内 ミサ; Jōnouchi Misa) (born 1960) is a composer, pianist, conductor and singer who creates Asian-styled new-age music.

Missa Johnouchi was named UNESCO Artist for Peace in August 2006, and works to commemorate the 1300th anniversary of the Capital of Nara Heijo-Kyo. It was the first time a Japanese female composer and conductor was appointed a UNESCO Artist for Peace.

== Career ==
While registered at the Academic institute of music of Toho, in the theory of musical composition section, she began to compose in the audio-visual area for successful television series, commercials, and the cinema. She studied in France under the direction of composer Jean-Claude Petit.

Since 1988, Missa Johnouchi is accompanied by the Orchestre National de l’Opéra de Paris and the Orchestre National de Paris on her albums. In 1993, she participated in the international conductors contest of Besançon.

Her album of Asian original compositions, “Healing Music”, was one of the best selling albums in the occidental countries.

Among her several performances, and for the first time ever, she gave a concert based on her own compositions, as a pianist and as a conductor, in the department of Nara, in front of Kofukuji and Higashikondo (indicated like national treasures).

Missa Johnouchi wrote, composed, and played the music in the opening ceremony of the Flower Festival of Hamanakako, entitled “New elegances of the flowers”, whose production was ensured by a great Master of Japanese poetry, Mannojo Nomura.

At the “World Heritage Torch-Run Concert” Missa Johnouchi organized upon the initiative of several countries around the world. The artist plays her own musical compositions on the piano and directs the national orchestras of these countries. She performed in America, China, Tunisia, Italy, Australia, Venezuela, Peru, Canada, Macedonia, Romania and France for commemorative events.

At Carnegie Hall in New York, 200 families of the victims of the terrorist attack of September 11, 2001, were invited to the concert organized for the wish to obtain peace.

She also performed for the 30th anniversary of the Japanese and Australian relations at the Opera house in Sidney, a UNESCO list of the world heritage.

In May 2007, at the “World Heritage Torch-Run Concert for the 35th anniversary of the convention on the protection of the world heritage” in the church of Saint-Germain-des-Prés in Paris, Missa Johnouchi played her own music, and she directed the Orchestre National de l’Opéra de Paris that accompanied her.

Moreover, she composed the music that accompanied the images of the exhibition at the Petit Palais of Paris, entitled “Shôkokuji, Gold Pavilion, Silver Pavilion, Zen and Art with Kyoto within the celebration of the 150th birthday of the Japanese and French relations and the 50th birthday of the Paris and Kyoto twin cities”.

In October 2009, the album “Spiritual Discovery” is released, for the first time in cooperation with UNESCO.

Still today, she continues, in her own country and abroad, in her role as a UNESCO messenger, as could be seen during the concert that took place at UNESCO’s Headquarters on 12 November 2009 in Paris, and in Tokyo in November 2010, where she gave a charity concert for the children of Afghanistan. She was the first Japanese female “UNESCO Artist for Peace (in charge of the world heritage)” in the section musical composition and conduction, to continue to transmit the message on “ Peace of the heart”, “ conservation of the world heritage”, “ environmental protection”, “ education”.

== Discography ==
=== Asian Blossoms (13 Jun 2000) ===
- 1. Asian Wind
- 2. Seasons
- 3. Marco Polo
- 4. Song Of Silk Road
- 5. Blossom
- 6. Springtime
- 7. Night Bird
- 8. Butterfly
- 9. Twilight
- 10. Once Upon A Time
- 11. Asian Wind – (Piano Version)

=== Friends (19 August 2000) ===
- 1. Pastoral
- 2. Espoir
- 3. In Paradisum
- 4. Tristesse
- 5. Tomorrow
- 6. Solitude
- 7. Forest
- 8. Walking On Air
- 9. Mirage
- 10. Aprés Midi
- 11. Glowing Sky
- 12. Spoons Dance
- 13. Tristesse (Reprise)

=== Yamatoji Symphony : The Eternal Yamato (2002) ===
- 1. Birth [Tanjou]
- 2. Prayers
- 3. Vicissitudes [Eikoseisui]
- 4. The Wings Of Spacetime [Jikuu no Tsubasa]

=== road to OASIS (12 February 2002) ===
- 1. The Last Caravan
- 2. Shangri-La
- 3. road to OASIS
- 4. Desert Mirage
- 5. Moon Over The Border
- 6. Snow Bird
- 7. Stardust Tapestry
- 8. Nomads
- 9. Holy Sunset
- 10. Prayer
- 11. Horizon

=== Dimanche (21 September 2002) ===
- 1. Hoshi no Kioku [Memories Of Stars]
- 2. Maioriru Tenshi [Flying Down Angel]
- 3. Akanegumo [Rosy Clouds]
- 4. Mayonaka no Mail [Midnight Mail]
- 5. Chikyuugi [Globe]
- 6. My Friend (to Vivian)
- 7. Screen Music ni Koishi te [Loving Screen Music]
- 8. Koi no Atokataduke [After Love]
- 9. Ieji [The Way Home]
- 10. Umibe no Gogo [Afternoon At Seaside]
- 11. Je n'aime pas moi

=== Kurenai (28 September 2002) ===
- 1. Legend Of The Mountain
- 2. Dream Land
- 3. Kurenai
- 4. Pilgrimage
- 5. Sea Wind
- 6. Déjà Vu ~Light in the Void
- 7. Full Moon Bay
- 8. Shanghai Twilight
- 9. Desert Walk
- 10. Lawrence
- 11. Silky Sky
- 12. End Of The Silk Road

=== Kataribe ~Piano Collection (26 Jun 2003) ===
- 1. Kataribe (Story Teller)
- 2. Miyako (Ancient City)
- 3. Streets Of Kyoto
- 4. Asian Wind – (piano version)
- 5. Funauta (A Boatman's Song)
- 6. Shigure (A Scattered Shower)
- 7. Shuufu (Antumn Breeze)
- 8. Springtime
- 9. Snow Forest
- 10. Hatsuyuki (First Snow)
- 11. Déjà Vu ~Light in the Void
- 12. Sekka (Snow Blossoms)
- 13. Horizon
- 14. Snow Dance

=== Kuge (29 October 2003) ===
DISC 1

- 1. Skyward
- 2. Stardust Island
- 3. Lake
- 4. Kazamatsuri
- 5. Kataribe
- 6. Exotica
- 7. Prayer (Suite "Yamatoji Symphony : The Eternal Yamato" #2)
- 8. Kotohime
- 9. Sunset Moon

DISC 2 (Symphony)

- 1. Kuge II
- 2. Eurasia

=== Canon ~Missa Johnouchi Best (29 September 2004) ===
- 1. Asian Wind
- 2. Stardust Tapestry
- 3. Kataribe
- 4. Seasons
- 5. Moon Beach
- 6. Marco Polo
- 7. Desert Mirage
- 8. Pilgrimage
- 9. Shangri-La
- 10. Shanghai Twilight
- 11. Night Bird
- 12. Kirisamekodo (Ancient Roads in the Mist)

=== Evening (22 Jun 2005) ===
- 1. Evening
- 2. Marco Polo (Remix)
- 3. Lake (Remix)
- 4. A Song Of The Lilies (Piano & Strings)
- 5. Asian Wind (Remix)
- 6. road to OASIS (Remix)
- 7. Il Pleure dans mon cœur (Piano & Strings)
- 8. Evening (Piano Version)

=== Snow ~Piano Collection (18 July 2006) ===
- 3. Snow Forest
- 6. Shigure (A Scattered Shower)
- 9. Sekka (Snow Blossoms)
- 10. Hatsuyuki (First Snow)

=== Le Chant de La Terre (11 October 2007) ===
- 1. Le Chant de La Terre
- 2. Kaze no Hohoemi [Wind's Smile]
- 3. Ilumine
- 4. Harukana Tabi no Naka de [In Distant Travels]
- 5. Snow Bird (Violin & Piano Version)
- 6. Taiyou no Michi [The Road of the Sun]
- 7. Le Muguet
- 8. Tsumetai Tsuki no Hikari wo Abite [A Cold Moonlight Shower]
- 9. Souseki [Genesis]
- 10. Genka
- 11. Kono Te wo Kazashite [Put Up Your Hands]
- 12. Avec Toi Toujours

=== Green Earth (24 September 2008) ===
- 1. Green Earth
- 2. Life
- 3. Sea Green
- 4. Desert Moon
- 5. Sad Forest
- 6. For Maori
- 7. Ripples
- 8. Ondines
- 9. Border
- 10. Sakura Kaoru
- 11. The end of the Journey

=== Spiritual Discovery (21 October 2009) ===
- 1. Original Scenery
- 2. Glowing Horizon
- 3. Fluttering
- 4. Journey to the next World
- 5. Rising Sun
- 6. Live in Quiet
- 7. Japonisme
- 8. Peace of Mind
- 9. Purplish Tone
- 10. Beauty in the Seasons
- 11. Journey of the Soul
- 12. Original Scenery

=== Missa Johnouchi (Best Album) (6 October 2010) ===
- Disc 1
  - Ano Koro [That Time]
  - Kimagure Hakusho
  - Dakishimete Once Again [To Hug You Once Again]
  - Maioriru Tenshi [Flying Down Angel]
  - Cafe CLASSIQUE
  - Aru Hareta Nichi ni [In a Fine Day]
  - Hikari Afure te ~requiem~
  - Harukanaru Kisetsu ni [In Distant Season]
  - Ieji [The Way Home]
  - Ai no Chikara [The Power of Love]
  - Ken [The Keys]
  - Le Courage
  - Kimi no Koe ga Kikitai [Want to Hear Your Voice]
  - Kimi wo Matsu Seishun [The Youth to Wait for You]
  - Toki no Kawa [The River of Time]
  - Il Pleure dans mon ceur
  - Watashi no Sonzai no Imi [The Meaning of My Being]
  - Avec Toi Toujours
- Disc 2
  - Asian Wind
  - Marco Polo
  - In Paradisum (Single Version)
  - Kataribe (Piano & String Version)
  - Shangri-la
  - Prayer
  - Kuge II
  - Evening
  - souvenir d'amour
  - Lux ~Sukui~ [salvation]
  - Pure
  - Le Chant de La Terre
  - Illumine
  - Sakura Kaoru [The Fragrance of Cherry Blossoms]
  - Original Scenery

=== Will Light (2013) ===
- 1. Will Light
- 2. Lesson in the Life
- 3. Timeless Wind
- 4. Deja vu
- 5. Friendship
- 6. Passed the Film
- 7. Eternal Time
- 8. Farewell Rain
- 9. Il pleure dans mon coer
- 10. Requiem
- 11. Miracle of Morning

== Single ==
=== Il pleure dans mon cœur ===
- 1. Il pleure dans mon cœur
- 2. Pure
- 3. Seinaru Toki 2 [Holy Moment 2]

=== Avec Toi Toujours ===
- 1. Avec Toi Toujours
- 2. Avec Toi Toujours (Instrumental)
- 3. Kono Te wo Kazashite [Put Up Your Hands]
- 4. Kono Te wo Kazashite (Instrumental)

=== Watashi no Sonzai no Imi ===
- 1. The Meaning of My Being [Watashi no Sonzai no Imi]
- 2. The Meaning of My Being (La La La Version)
- 3. The Meaning of My Being (Instrumental)
- 4. Indigo Sunset [Aiiro no Yuuhi]

== External Sources ==
- Missa Johnouchi Official Website
- Pacific Moon
- NPO WORLD HERITAGE TORCH-RUN CONCERT
