= Aika (singer) =

Japanese singer/songwriter

- Born: Aika Hirahara; Tokyo, Japan
- Origin: Tokyo, Japan
- Genres: Pop, rock, jazz, acoustic, electronica
- Occupations: Singer/songwriter, Saxophone Player
- Instruments: Saxophone, Guitar, Piano
- Years active: 2006–present
- Labels: EMI Music Japan(2006-2008); Neilaproductions(2008-present)
- Website: www.aikaofficial.com

Aika Hirahara, known mononymously as Aika (pronounced [aꜜika]; stylized in all caps), is a Japanese singer-songwriter, currently residing in Los Angeles, California, United States. She is known for her 2006 debut album Ai-Wo, with its songs "Orange Moon" and "Ai-wo", which reached the top 10 in Japanese charts on its first week of its release. Her second studio album was released in February 2017. In 2018, she released "Heard an Angel." She co-wrote the gold-certified song "Path of Independence" for her sister, Ayaka Hirahara.

== Background ==
Aika was born in Tokyo, Japan. Growing up, she played the piano and the saxophone. Later pursuing a music degree at the Berklee College of Music in Boston. Shortly after completing her degree, she released her debut album Ai-Wo (through EMI records), which reached the top 10 on the Japanese radio charts. Her father, Makoto Hirahara, is a professional saxophonist, and her grandfather, Tsutomu Hirahara, is a professional trumpet player. Her sister, Ayaka Hirahara, is also a performer, signed to Universal Music Japan.

== Performances and career ==
Her performances include the Osaka "Act Against Aids" concert, JZ Brat and the Living Room in New York City. Her 2009 song "All He Has to Say" was produced to support Autism Speaks and was based on a poem by a teacher at the May Center for Child Development.

Aika has written and performed the original song "Dancing Arrows," which was selected as the theme song for the Warner Brothers movie Ironclad. It is included on the EURORADIO's 2014 "Tune In" CD collection.

Aika also contributed the song "Solé" for the 2016 movie Whiskey Tango Foxtrot.

== Discography ==
=== Studio albums ===
List of Studio Albums
Title	Album details
AI-WO - International Edition	Released: October 2006; Label: True Blue (Blue Note)
AI-WO - Japan Edition	Released: November 2006; Label: EMI Music Japan
No Mo Games	Released: 2017

=== Compilation albums ===
List of Compilation Albums
Title	Album details
Tune In	Song: "Dancing Arrows"; Released: 2014

=== Singles ===
List of Singles
Title	Single details
"All He Has to Say"	Released: 2008; Label: Neilaproductions
"aika (Sinking & You Told Me You Loved Me)"	Released: 2010; Label: Neilaproductions
"Dancing Arrows"	Released: 2011; Label:Neilaproductions
"I Can't Make You Love Me"	Released: 2014; Label: Neilaproductions
"NO MO GAMES"	Released: 2015; Label: Neilaproductions
"Heard an Angel"	Released: 2018; Label: Neilaproductions
"daddy"	Released: November 2023; Label: Neilaproductions
"white noise"	Released: November 2023; Label: Neilaproductions

=== Music videos ===
List of Music Videos
Title	Music Video details
"Ai-wo"	Released: 2006; Label: EMI Music Japan
"Orange Moon"	Released: 2006; Label: EMI Music Japan
"Dancing Arrows"	Released: 2011; Label: Neilaproductions
"I Can't Make You Love Me"	Released: 2014; Label: Neilaproductions
"We Are Here"	Released: 2014; Label: Neilaproductions
"NO MO GAMES"	Released: 2015; Label: Neilaproductions
"daddy"	Released: 2023; Label: Neilaproductions
"white noise"	Released: 2023; Label: Neilaproductions

=== Movies ===
List of movies
Movie Title	Movie details
Iron Clad	Released: 2011; Song: "Dancing Arrows"
Whiskey Tango Foxtrot	Released: 2016; Song: "Solé"

== Career as a songwriter ==
=== Singles ===
List of songs
Title	Song details
"Not a Love Song"	Released: 2012; Label: Dreamusic
"Boy I Wish You Are Here"	Released: 2012; Label: Dreamusic
"Made of Stars"	Released: 2013; Label: Universal Music
"Prayer"	Released: 2015; Label: Universal Music
"Save Your Life" Ayaka Hirahara x Daniel Powter	Released: 2021; Label: Universal Music
"「Live Out Loud」Kelsie Watts & Reezy Mi$HNRZ"	Released: 2021; Label: Neilaproductions
"This is Me ~Rainbow~ / GAP x Leslie Kee ★ the Diversity Song tribute to IMAGINE 50th Anniversary"	Released: 2021; Label: Neilaproductions
"Wedding Day"	Released: 2023; Label: A-ya Records
"Don't Cry"	Released: 2023; Label: A-ya Records

=== Albums ===
List of albums
Title	Album details
"Path of Independence"	Album: Path of Independence; Released: 2008; Label: Dreamusic
"Hush Hush"	Album: Doki; Released: 2012; Label: Dreamusic
"Not a Love Song"	Album: Doki; Released: 2012; Label: Dreamusic
"Made of Stars"	Album: What I Am; Released: 2013; Label: Universal Music
"Tweet Your Love"	Album: What I Am; Released: 2013; Label: Universal Music
"Prayer"	Album: Prayer; Releasing: 2015; Label: Universal Music
"Save Your Life" Ayaka Hirahara	Released: 2021; Label: Universal Music
"A-ya!" Ayaka Hirahara 20th Anniversary	Released: 2023; Label: A-ya Records

=== Tours and live shows ===
Tour
Title	Notes
The Voice -2005-	w/Ayaka Hirahara; 2005; Vocal/Background Vocal/Saxophone
Premium Live Sponsored by Itoen -2005-	w/Ayaka Hirahara; 2005; Vocal/Background Vocal/Saxophone
From The New World -2010-	w/Ayaka Hirahara; 2010; Vocal/Background Vocal/Saxophone/Guitar
Love Story -2011-	w/Ayaka Hirahara; 2011; Vocal/Background Vocal/Saxophone/Guitar
Doki -2012-	w/Ayaka Hirahara; 2012; Vocal/Background Vocal/Saxophone/Guitar
Dear Jupiter 10th Anniversary Tour -2013-	w/Ayaka Hirahara; 2013; Vocal/Background Vocal/Saxophone/Guitar
10th Year Special Live -2013-	w/Ayaka Hirahara; 2013; Vocal/Background Vocal/Saxophone
What I Am -2014-	w/Ayaka Hirahara; 2014; Vocal/Background Vocal/Saxophone/Guitar

=== AIKA tour and live shows ===
Tour
Title	Notes
Act Against AIDS in TOKYO -2005-	2006; Vocal
AI-Wo -2006-	2006; Vocal
Act Against AIDS at Osaka Jo Hall -2006-	2006; Vocal
MIZU NO OTO -2007-	2007; Vocal
UTA WO TSUMUIDE -2008-	2008; Vocal
LAWSON JAZZ WEEK	2011; Vocal/Saxophone/Guitar
MONTREUX JAZZ FESTIVAL in KAWASAKI	2012; Vocal/Saxophone/Guitar
AIKA LIVE IN TOKYO	2014; Vocal/Saxophone/Guitar
A I K A Live at The Mint LA	February 2015; Vocal/Guitar/Saxophone
A I K A Live at The Mint LA	March 2015; Vocal/Guitar/Saxophone
A I K A Live at Room5 LA	May 2015; Vocal/Guitar/Saxophone
A I K A Live at Haretara Sorani Mamemaite Tokyo	July 2015; Vocal/Guitar/Saxophone
Jupiter Foundation at Kokusai Forum	January 2018; Vocal/Guitar/Saxophone
Jupiter Foundation at Kokusai Forum	March 2019; Vocal/Guitar/Saxophone
