= Haruka Kohara =

Japanese idol (born 1988)

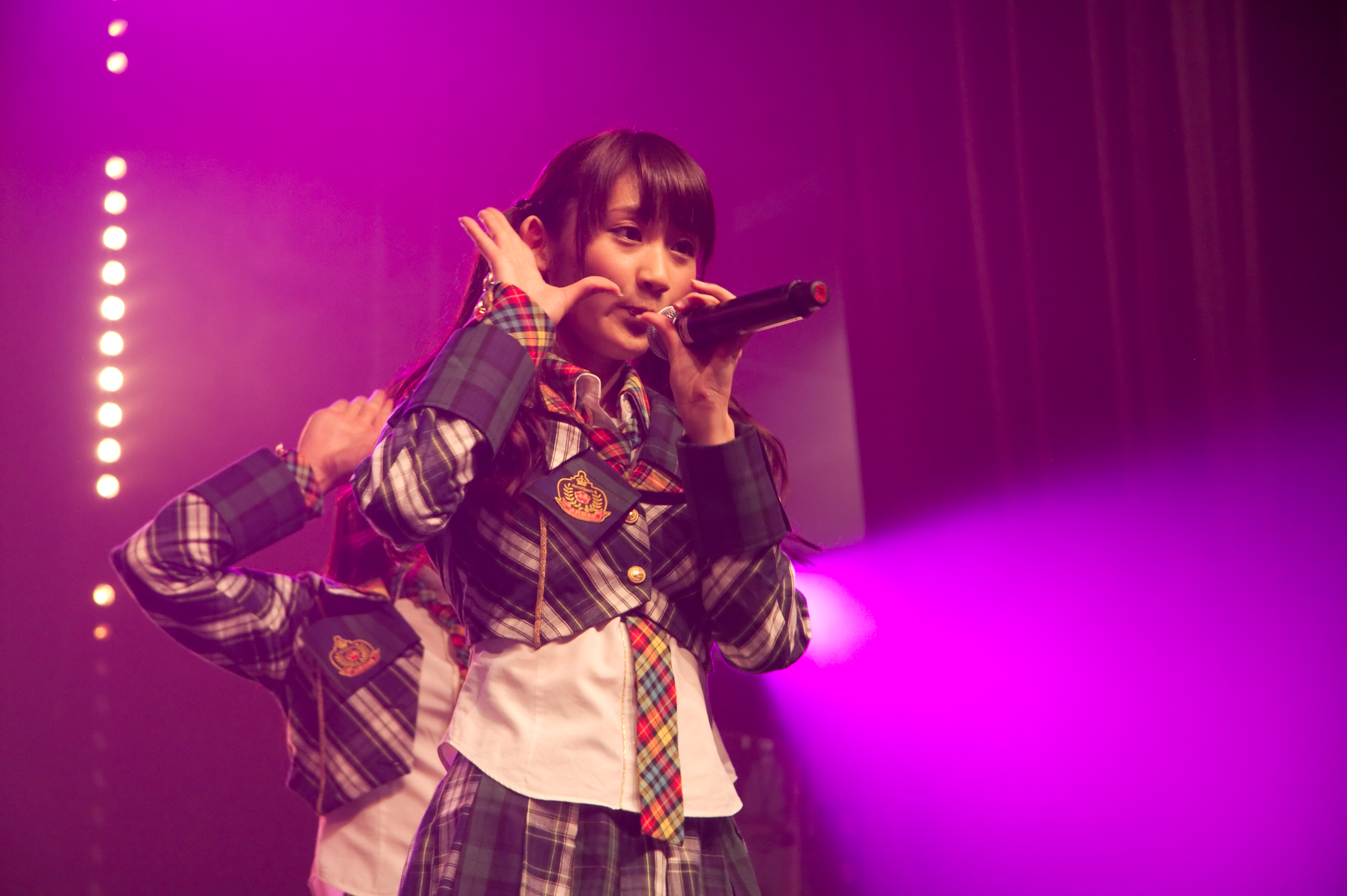
Haruka Kohara when she was a member of AKB48

Haruka Kohara (小原 春香, Kohara Haruka; born April 12, 1988) is a former member of the Japanese idol groups AKB48 and SDN48.
